= Târgu Mureș =

City in Mureș County, Romania

Târgu Mureș Marosvásárhely (Hungarian)
- County seat and Municipality
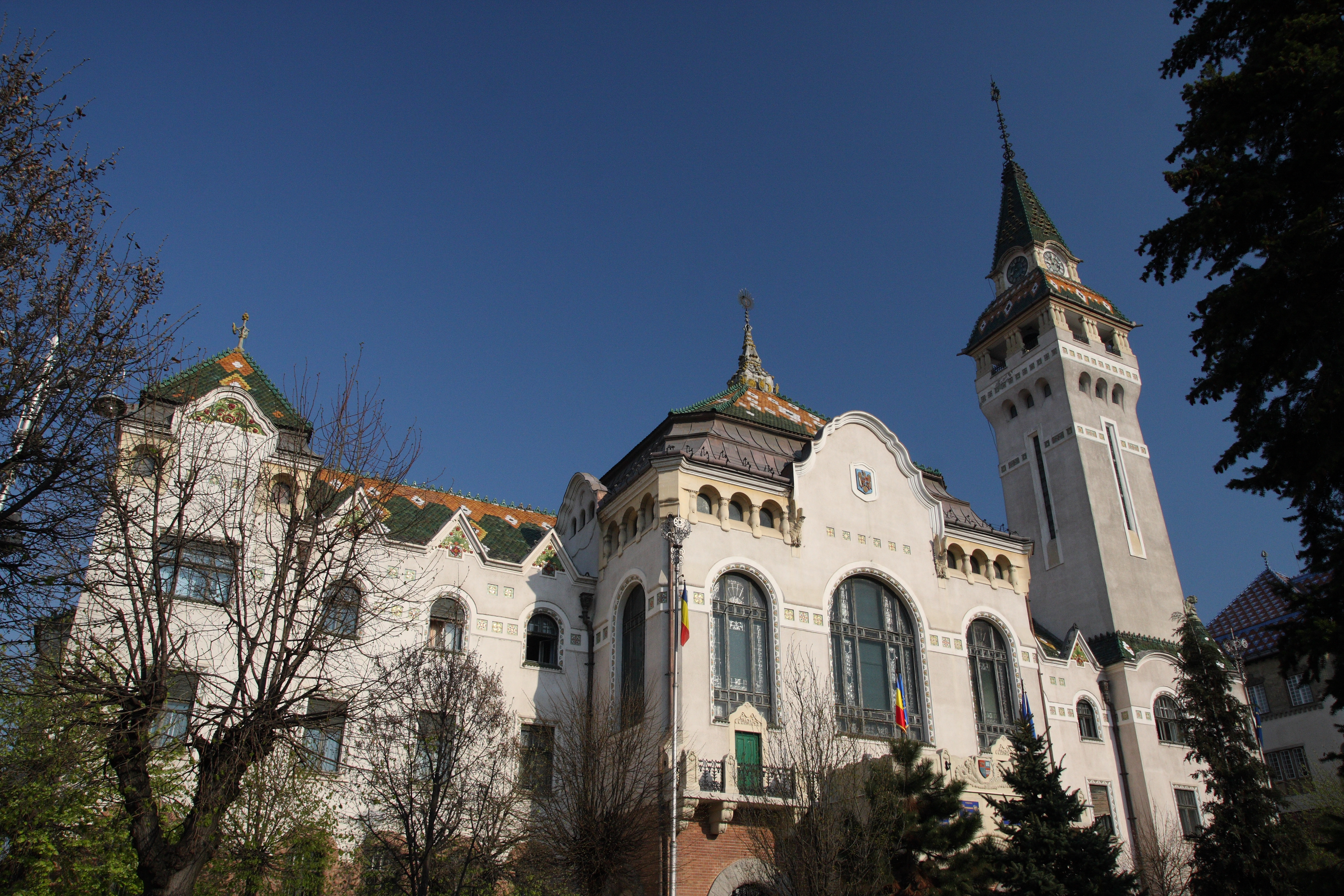
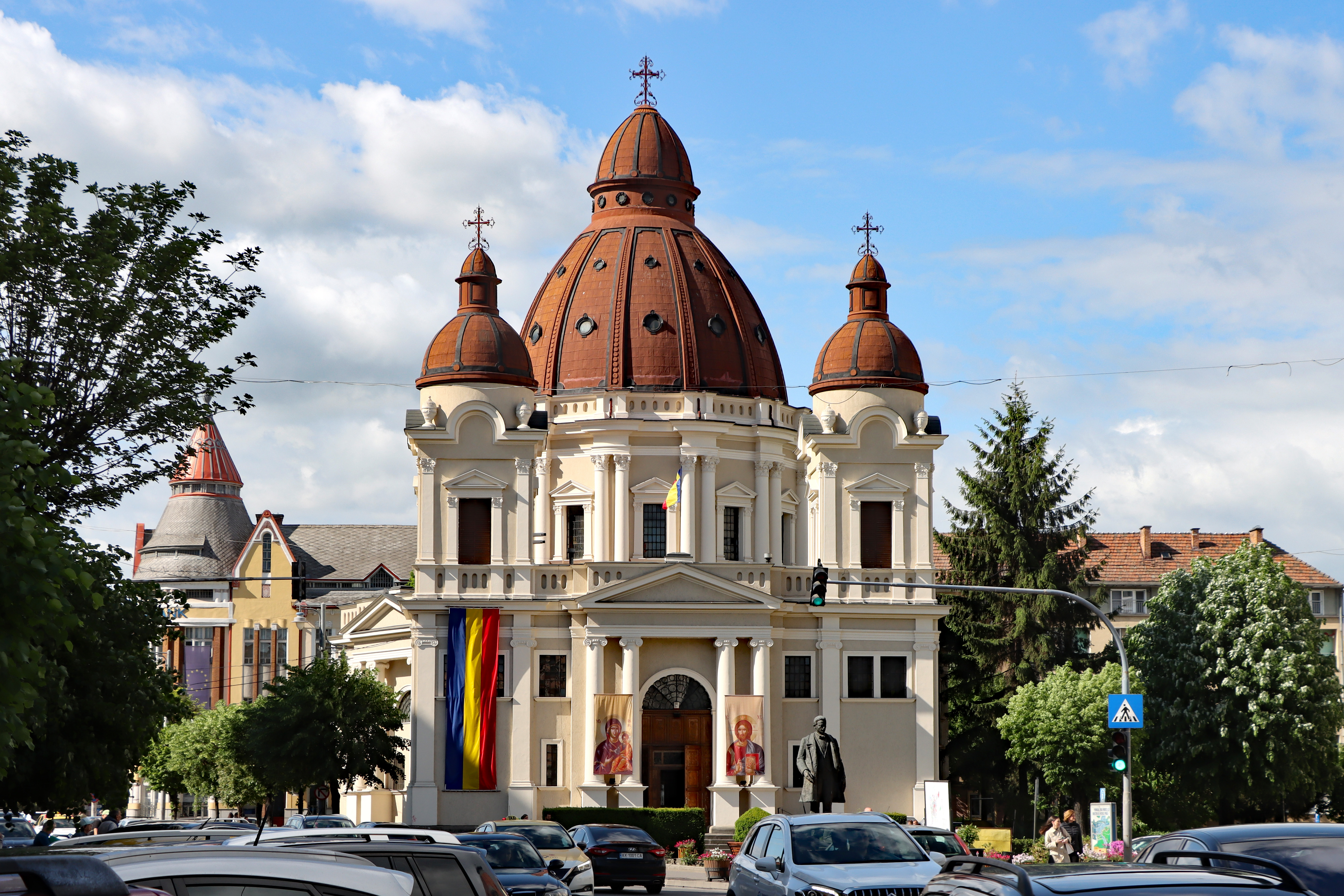
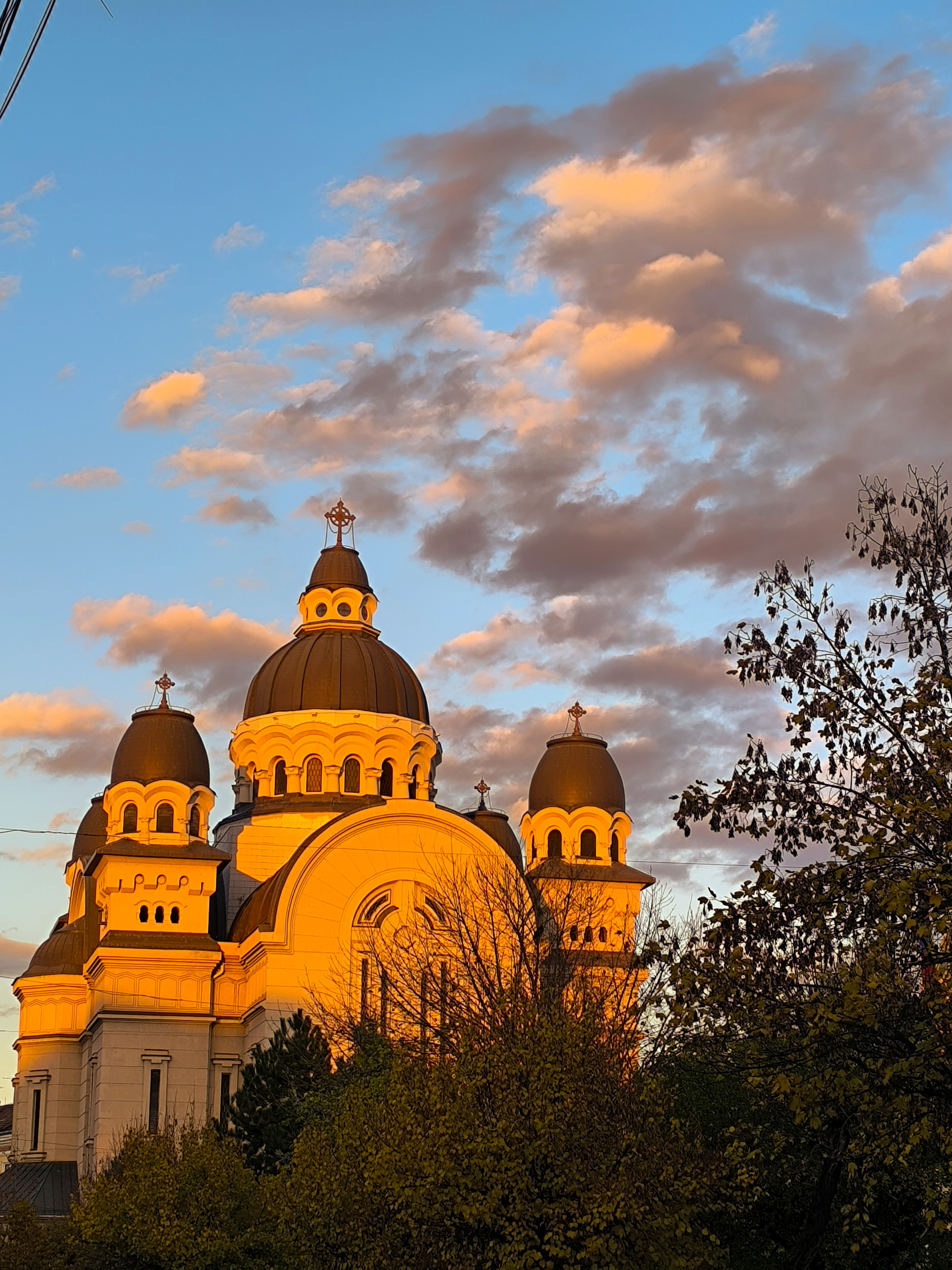
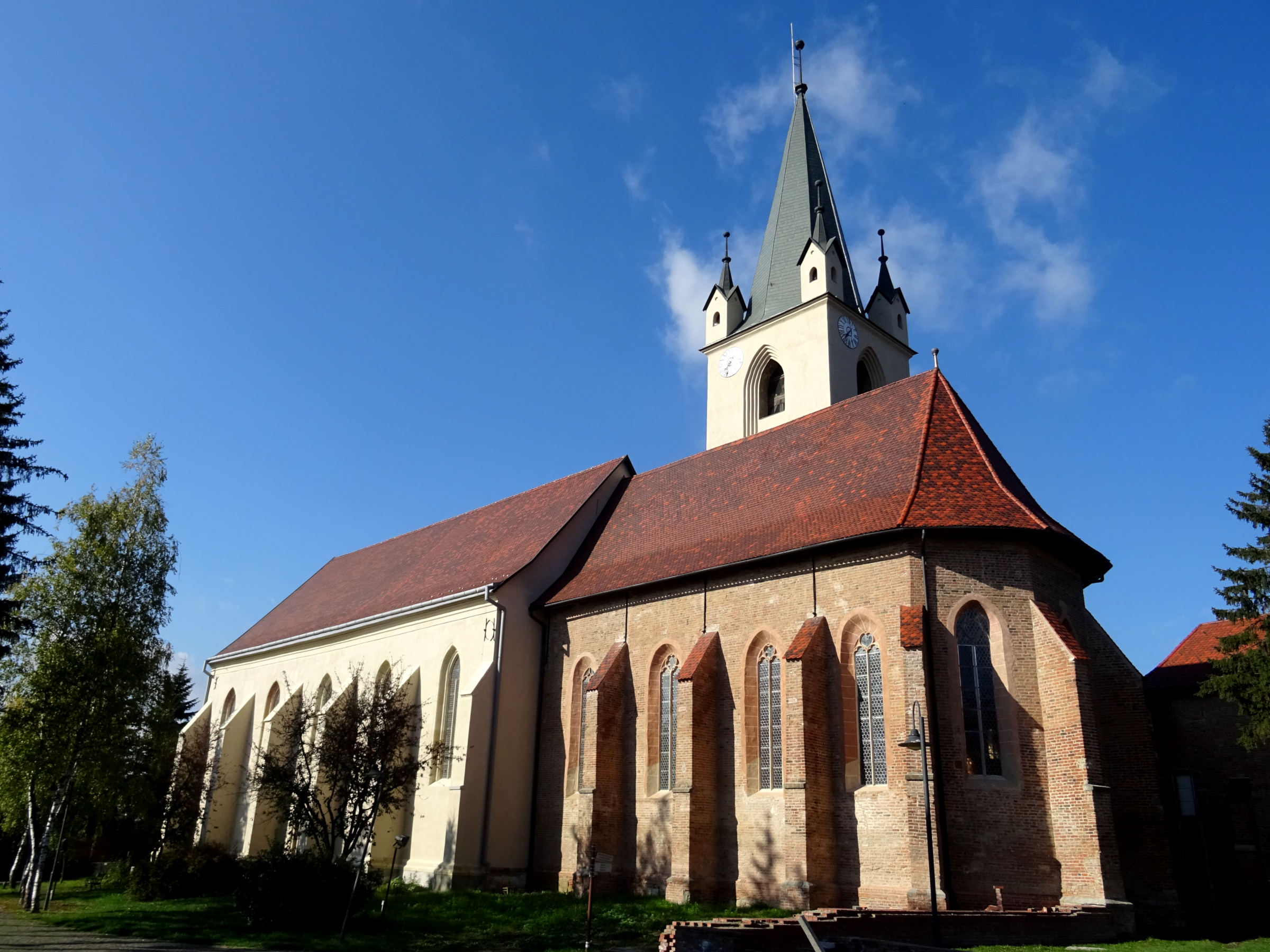
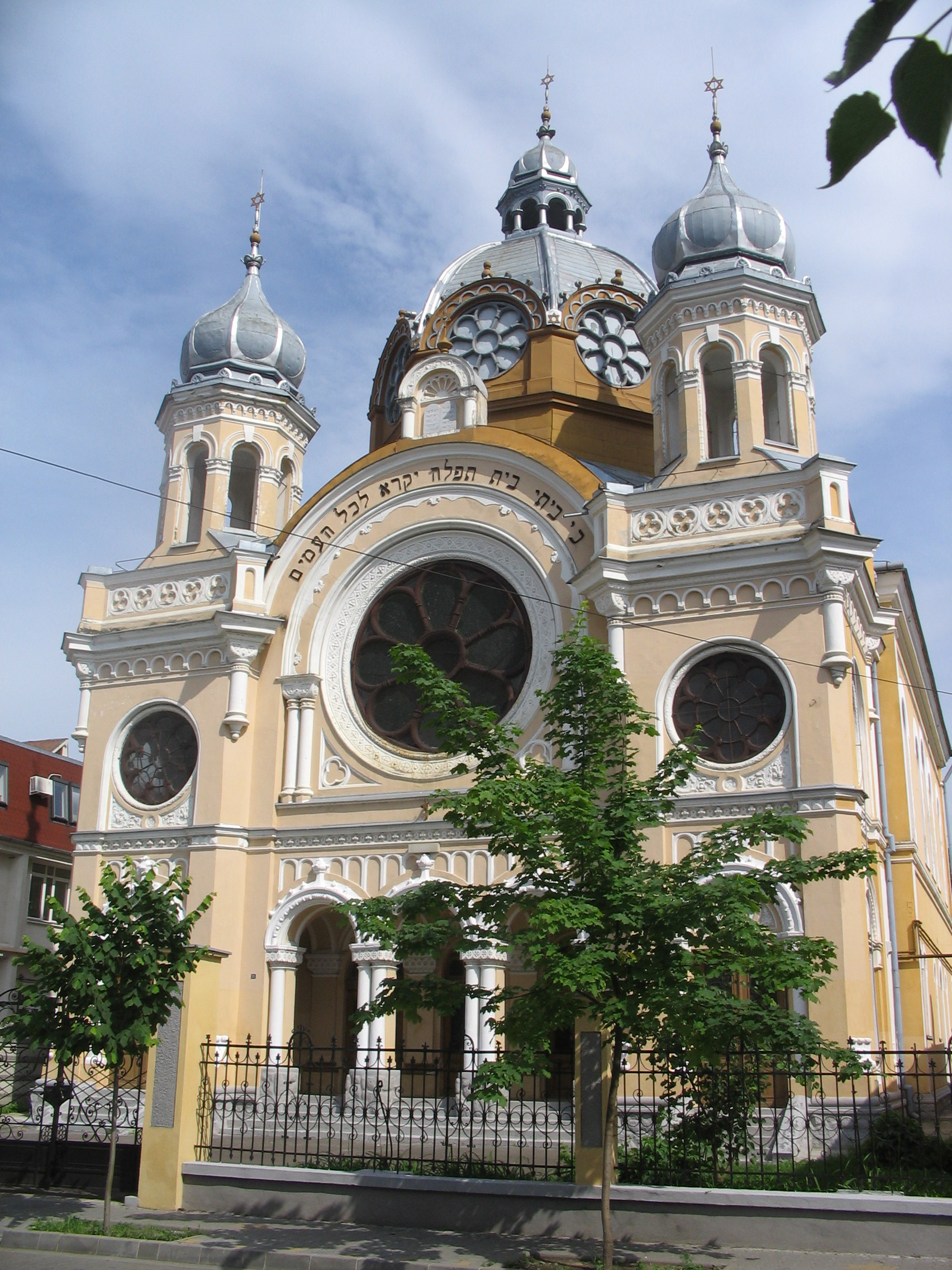
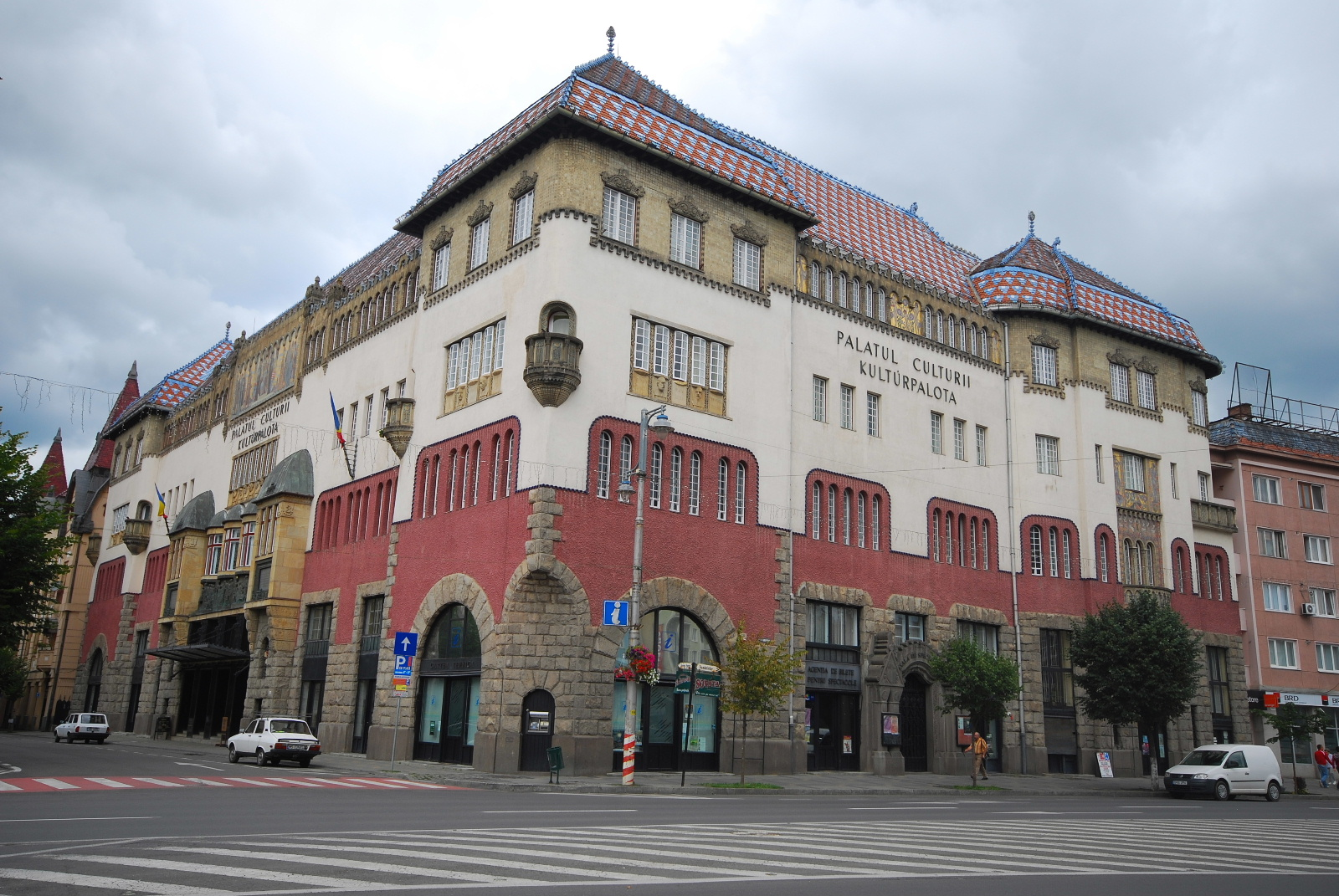
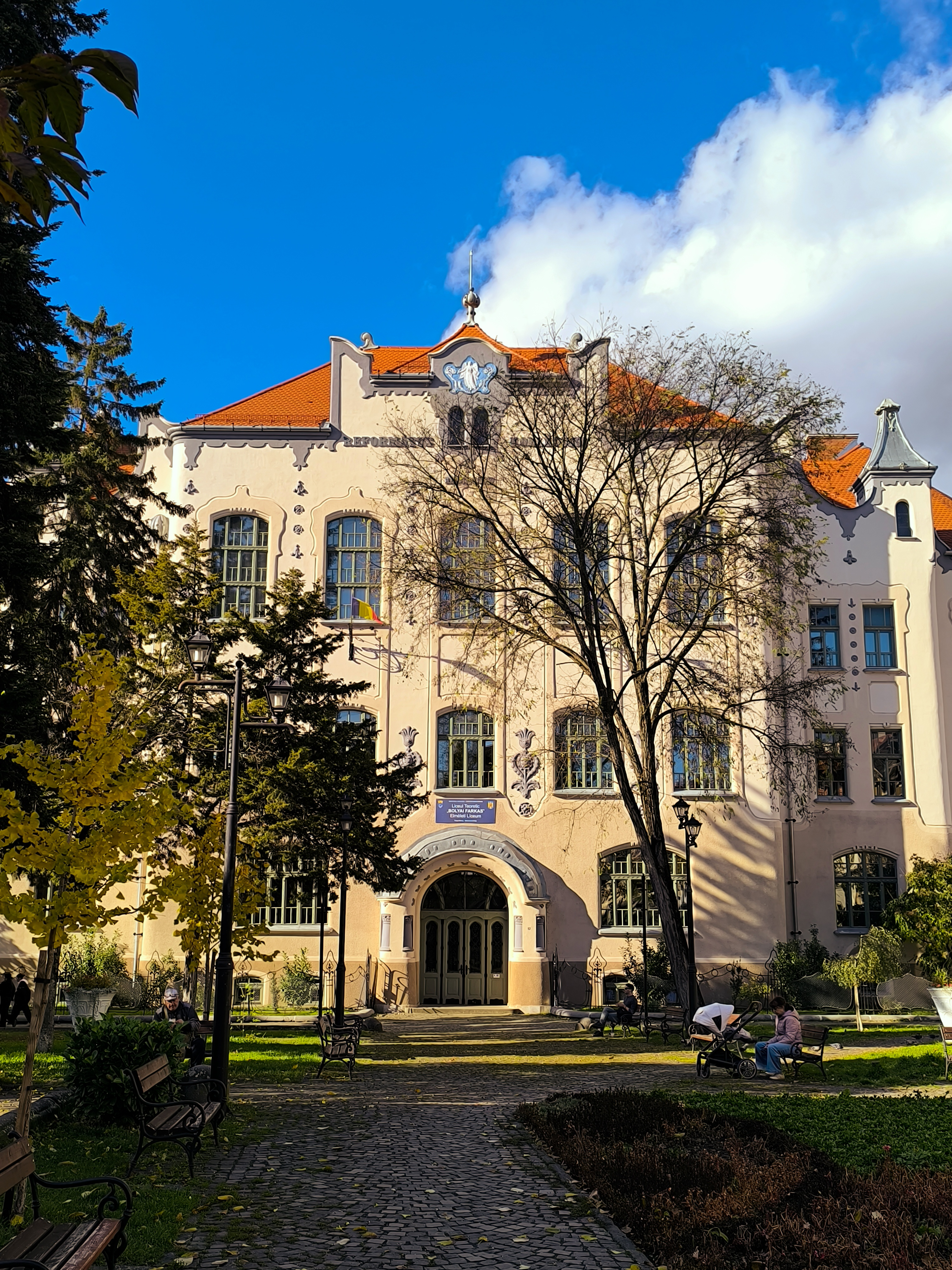
- County Prefecture Annunciation Cathedral Ascension of the Lord Orthodox Cathedral Fortress Reformed Church The Synagogue Palace of Culture Bolyai-Farkas High

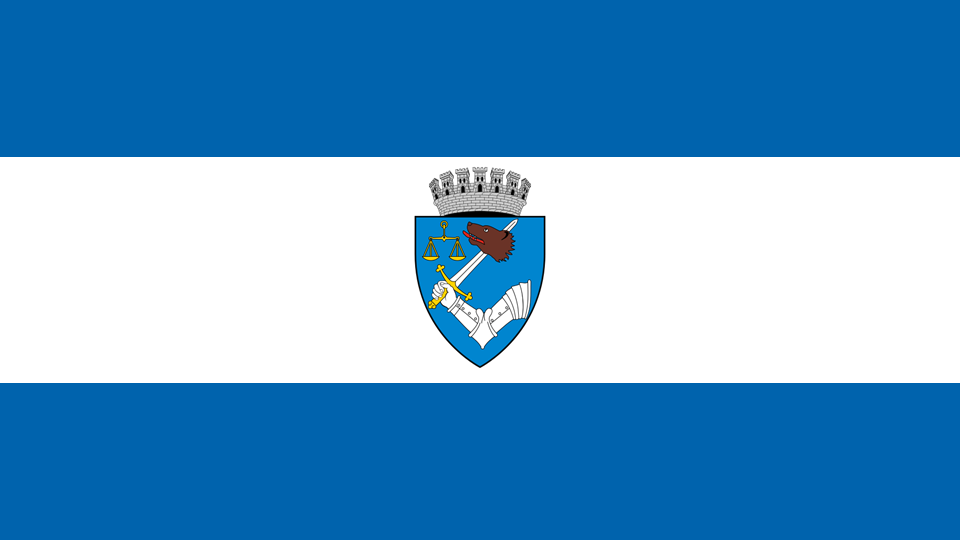
- Flag Coat of arms

- Location in Romania
- Coordinates: 46°32′44″N 24°33′45″E
- Country: Romania
- County: Mureș
- Status: County capital

Government
  - Mayor (2024–2028): Zoltán Soós (Ind.)

Area
  - County seat and Municipality: 49.3 km^{2} (19.0 sq mi)

Population (2021-12-01)
  - County seat and Municipality: 116,033
  - Density: 2,593/km^{2} (6,720/sq mi)
  - Metro: 212,752
- Demonym(s): târgumureșean, târgumureșeancă (ro) vásárhelyi (hu)

Ethnicity
  - Romanians: 51.9%
  - Hungarians: 45.2%
  - Roma: 2.5%
- Postal Code: 540xyz^{1}
- Area code: +40 x65^{2}
- Car Plates: MS-N^{3}
- Website: tirgumures.ro
- ^{1}x, y, and z are digits that indicate the street, part of the street, or even the building of the address^{2}x is a digit indicating the operator: 2 for the former national operator, Romtelecom, and 3 for the other ground telephone networks^{3}used just on the plates of vehicles that operate only within the city limits (such as trolleybuses, trams, utility vehicles, ATVs, etc.)

Târgu Mureș (Note: Frequently written as the equivalent Tîrgu Mureș due to changes in Romanian orthography.) (/ˌtɜːrɡuː ˈmʊərɛʃ, ˌtɪər-/, Romanian: [ˈtɨrɡu ˈmureʃ]; Hungarian: Marosvásárhely [ˈmɒroʃvaːʃaːrhɛj]; German: Neumarkt am Mieresch also known as simply Neumarkt) is the seat of Mureș County in the historical region of Transylvania, Romania. It is the 16th-largest city in Romania, with 116,033 inhabitants as of the 2021 census. It lies on the Mureș River, the second-longest river in Romania (after the Danube).

== Names and etymology ==
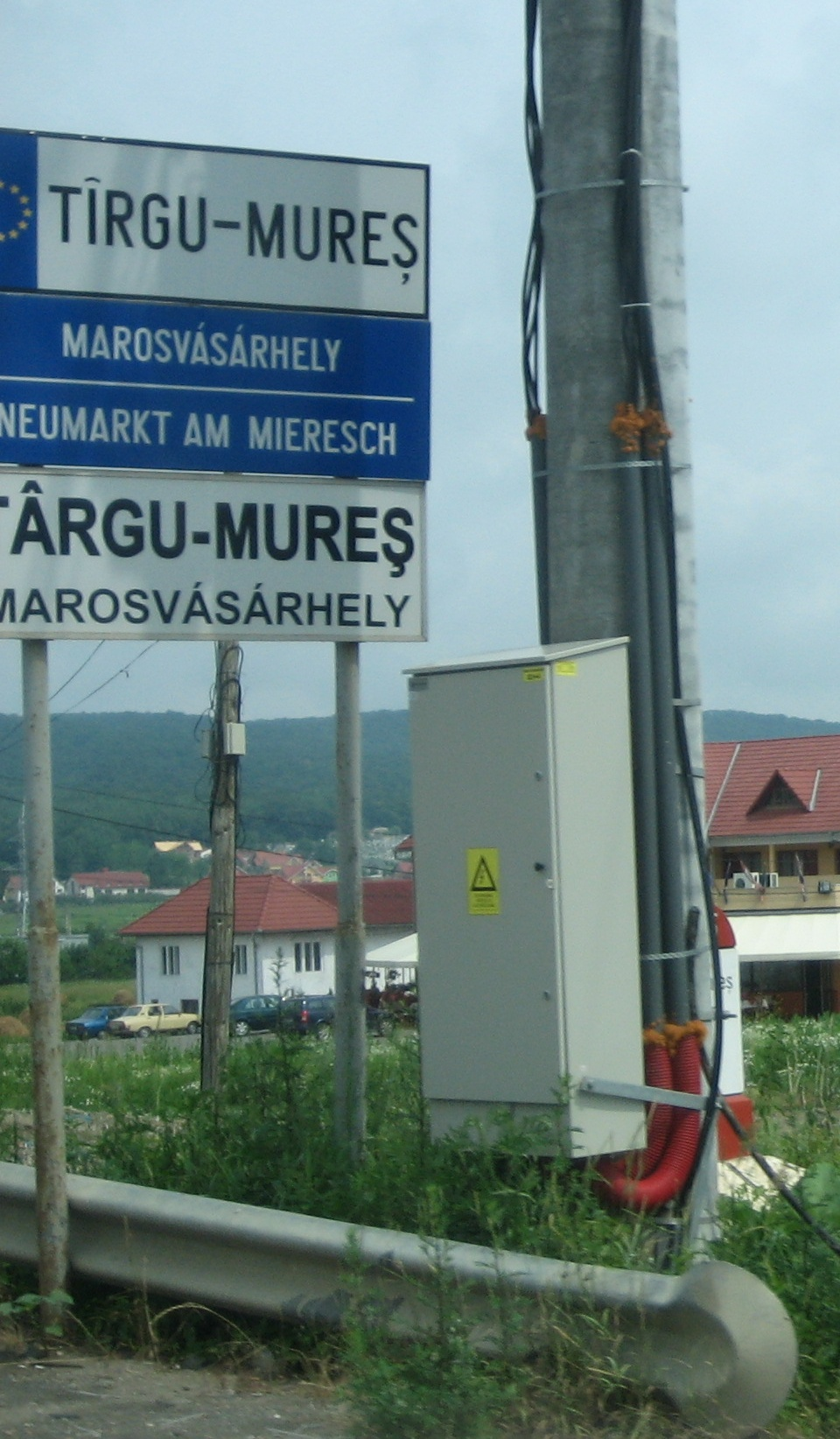
A trilingual town sign in Târgu Mureș. Marosvásárhely is the Hungarian name and Neumarkt am Mieresch, German. The top sign reflects the pre-1993 version Tîrgu-Mureș.

The current Romanian name of the city, Târgu Mureș, is the equivalent of the Hungarian Marosvásárhely, both meaning "market on the Mureș (Maros) [River]". Târg means "market" in Romanian and vásárhely means "marketplace" in Hungarian. Local Hungarians often shorten Marosvásárhely to Vásárhely in speech.

The Jesuit priest Martin Szentiványi provides the first known written reference naming the city; in his work Dissertatio Paralipomenonica Rerum Memorabilium Hungariae (written in Latin in 1699) he records the name as Asserculis: "Asserculis, hoc est Szekely Vasarhely", meaning "Asserculis, this is Szekely Vasarhely". He provides the year 1230 for the reference. A second work of his, Curiosiora Et Selectiora Variarum Scientiarum Miscellanea (dated 1702) also mentions this name.

Another written reference to the city was in the Papal registry (in Latin) as Novum Forum Siculorum in 1332, and later as Sekulvasarhel (modern Hungarian: Székelyvásárhely), meaning "market of the Székelys", in 1349. Greek traders called it "Agropolis". Another name for it was "Areopolis".

In 1616, Gabriel Bethlen gave the name Marosvásárhely to the newly upgraded royal free city. The Romanian name at that time, Oșorhei, was a phonetic derivation from Vásárhely; the German name, Neumarkt am Mieresch (also shortened to Neumarkt or Marktstadt; in Transylvanian Saxon, Nai Mark or Nai Muark), can be translated as New Market (on the Mureș).

Other historical Romanian names for the town besides Oșorhei were Mureș-Oșorhei and Târgul-Mureșului; other historical Hungarian names in addition to Székelyvásárhely included Újszékelyvásár and Újvásár.

After World War I, Marosvásárhely became part of Romania and was renamed Oșorheiu. The name Târgu Mureș became common in the interwar period. After World War II, the spelling of the city's name was changed to Tîrgu Mureș, following a 1953 spelling reform that replaced the letter â with î in all words. Another spelling reform in 1993 changed î back to â in some words, and the city's name has since been officially spelled "Târgu Mureș".

== History ==
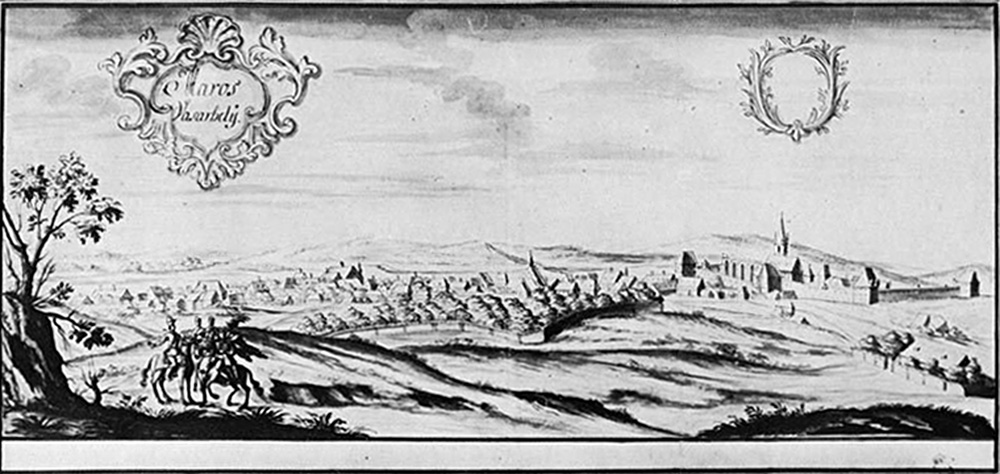
The city of Maros Vásárhely in 1735

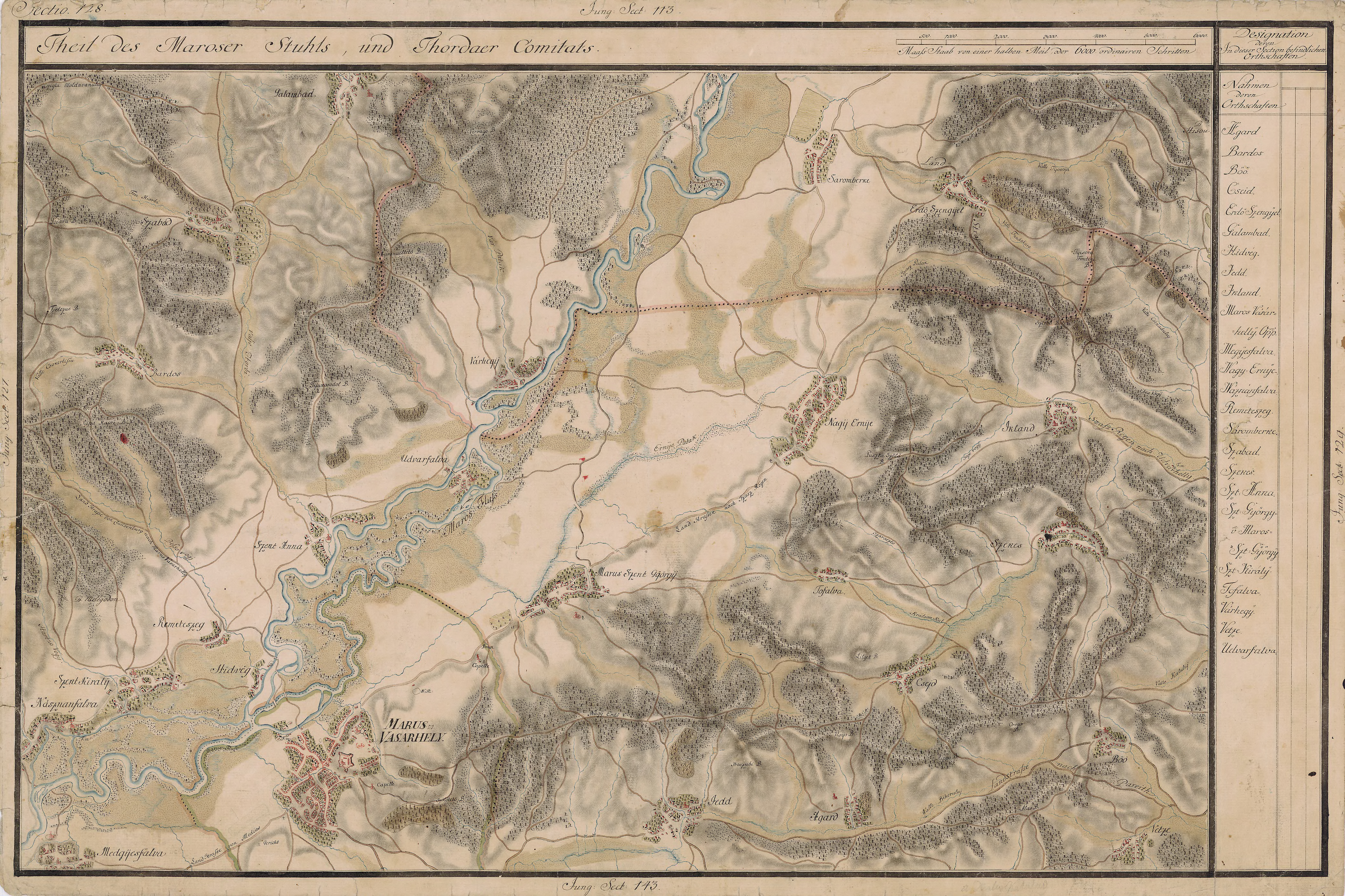
Marus-Vasarhely on the Map of Joseph II

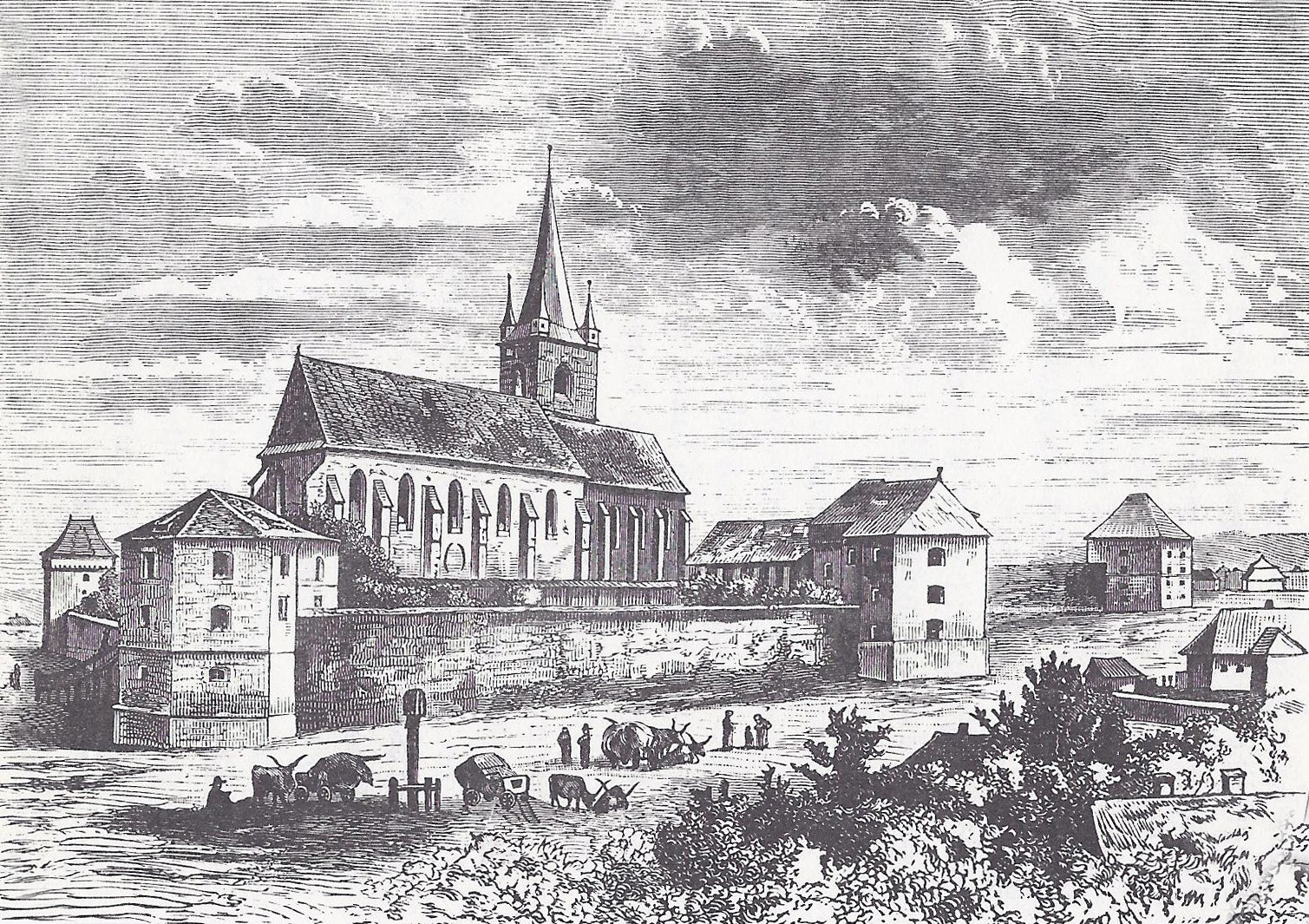
1860 engraving depicting the Reformed Church within the Citadel

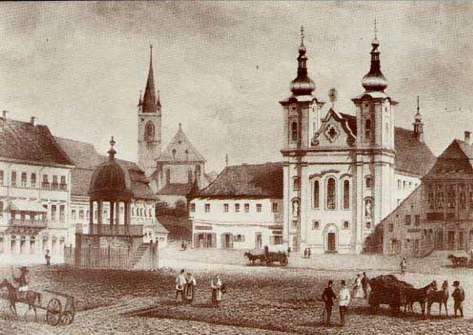
The centre with the reformed and catholic churches in the 19th century

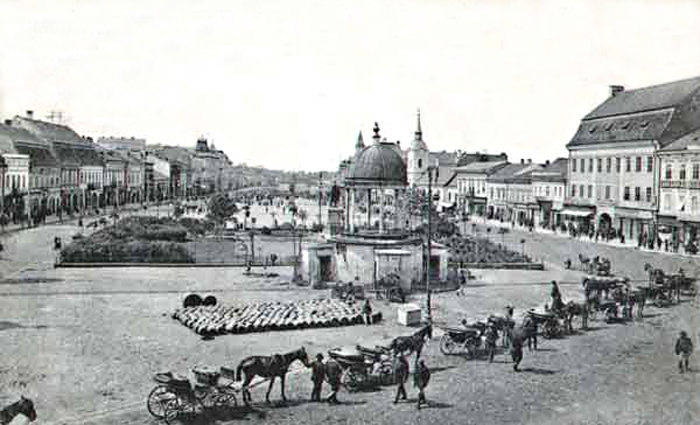
The city centre in 1911 with the musical fountain of Péter Bodor

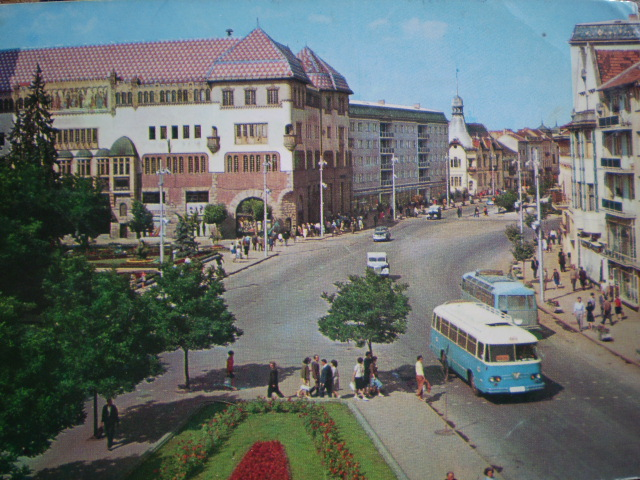
Târgu Mureș in the 1960s

The first known recorded documentation of the city dates to 1332. It is mentioned in the papal registry under the Latin name Novum Forum Siculorum meaning New Szekler Marketplace, and under the Hungarian name Sekulvasarhel (Székelyvásárhely) meaning Szekler Marketplace in 1349.

Prior to 1332 a Dominican church stood where the Fortress' Church is now sited, up until the Mongol invasion, when it was destroyed. The current Fortress' Church was built by the Franciscans in a new Gothic-style around 1332.

In 1405, the King of Hungary Sigismund of Luxembourg granted the city the right to organize fairs. Since 1439 the town was the scene of the sessions of the Transylvanian parliament (diet) 36 times. In 1470 King Matthias Corvinus granted the first judicial privilege to the city, and in 1482 declared the city a royal settlement. In 1492, wayvoda (prince) István Báthory strengthened a monastery with fortifications.

In 1506, the troops of Pál Tomori were beaten by the Székelys who were rising against the payment of an extraordinary Ox tax imposed on them on occasion of the birth of Louis II of Hungary. In 1557, the Reformed Church College (i.e., Presbyterians) was established as the oldest Hungarian school of Transylvania. In 1571, the session of the Transylvanian parliament under prince John II Sigismund Zápolya accepted the free preaching of the word of God, including by the Unitarian Church. In 1600–1601, as a result of the siege of Giorgio Basta under the direction of Emperor Rudolf II, the fortress crumbled to ruins. In 1602, the troops of Gergely Németh put on fire the remaining houses of the town, therefore, in 1602 the reconstruction of the fortress was started on the advice of mayor Tamás Borsos, but it was actually built between 1614 and 1653. Mózes Székely the only prince of Szekler origin visited the city in 1603 when he liberated Transylvania from foreign domination. In 1616, Târgu Mureș was granted the status of a free royal city under the name of Maros-Vásárhely by fejedelem (prince) Gábor Bethlen.

In 1658 Ottoman and Tartar troops invaded the city and burned it, where 3,000 people were taken into captivity. In 1661, as no one showed willingness to accept the duty of prince, under Turkish pressure Mihály Apafi was elected prince of Transylvania here. In 1662, resulting from the negligence of the Turkish military residing here, the city almost completely burnt down. In 1687 it was devastated by German imperial troops. In 1704, the kuruc troops of Pál Kaszás occupied the fortress, which was re-occupied by Austrian troops led by Lőrinc Pekry in 1706. On 5 April 1707 Francis II Rákóczi was raised to the chair of princes here. In 1707 the city was struck by the plague with more than 3,500 deaths. The plague renewed in 1709, 1719 and in 1738–39.

The city received a major boost to its social and economic life when it became home to the Supreme Court of Justice of the Principality of Transylvania in 1754. In 1802, the Teleki Library founded by count Sámuel Teleki opened to the public with 40,000 volumes.

Avram Iancu, the leader of the 1848 Romanian revolution in Transylvania, was a young lawyer in the city of Marosvásárhely before engaging in the fight for the rights of the Romanians living in Transylvania. On 4 November 1848, the Szekler troops were beaten by the Austrian imperial troops under its walls, and the city was also captured. On 13 January 1849 the troops of major Tolnay recaptured it. On 30 July 1849, Sándor Petőfi and Józef Bem set out from here for the Battle of Segesvár. Finally, the Austrian commander Karl von Urban captured the city on 2 August 1849, closing the chapter of the Revolutionary War in the city.

In 1854, Szekler martyrs Károly Horváth, János Török, and Mihály Gálfi were executed on the Postarét for plotting against Austrian rule. Since 1874 a monument marks the place. In 1861, Marosvásárhely became the seat of Marosszék, in 1876 that of Maros-Torda County. In 1880 the statue of Bem was inaugurated in Roses Square, in downtown area; in 1893 the statue of Kossuth was as well. The statue of Rákóczi was also inaugurated in 1907. All three statues were demolished between 1919 in 1923, after Transylvania became part of Romania.

The provincial appearance of the city changed greatly in the late 19th century and early 20th century. In 1913, the Hungarian Art-Nouveau style city hall complex and Palace of Culture was inaugurated, as part of mayor Bernády György's urban renewal. After World War I, together with the rest of Transylvania, Marosvásáshely became part of Romania and became known as Târgu Mureș. From having been an 89% Hungarian-populated city (in 1910), the Romanian population increased throughout the second half of the 20th century.

From 1940 to 1944, as a consequence of the Second Vienna Award, the city was ceded back to the Kingdom of Hungary. After Hungary was occupied by Germany in 1944, a Jewish ghetto was established in the city. Târgu Mureș re-entered the Romanian administration in October 1944. However, on 12 November 1944 General Vladislav Petrovich Vinogradov of the Soviet Red Army expelled the returning Romanian authorities from Northern Transylvania with reference to the massacres committed by members of the so-called Maniu Guard, and the Romanian authorities were not allowed to return until the government of Petru Groza was formed on 6 March 1945.

After World War II, the communist administration of Romania conducted a policy of massive industrialization that completely re-shaped the community. Between 1950 and 1968, Târgu Mureș was the center of the Magyar Autonomous Region, later renamed as Mureș-Magyar Autonomous Region. On 7 September 1959, Gheorghe Gheorghiu-Dej, Secretary-General of the Romanian Workers Party, and Prime Minister Chivu Stoica visited the city. It was decided at the time where to build the fertilizer production plant, and the new residential quarters of the city. It was decided that the residential quarters would not be built in the Mureș valley, but on the surrounding hills.

In March 1990, shortly after the Romanian Revolution of 1989 overthrew the communist regime, the city was the scene of violent ethnic clashes between ethnic Hungarians and ethnic Romanians.

In the 21st century, the local economy started to get stronger after various investors settled in the area. In 2020 the city elected Independent candidate Zoltán Soós as mayor - the first ethnic Hungarian in twenty years.

== Geography ==
The city is located in the Mureș River valley. The city spreads out from Fortress Church in the center of the town, built in the 14th century, to form an area of 49.3 square kilometres (19.0 sq mi). The city is located at the centre of the historical region of Transylvania and covers an area of 49.3 square kilometres (19.0 sq mi). It lies at the junction of three geographical regions of Transylvania (Transylvanian Plain, Mureș Valley and Niraj Valley) at 330 m (1,083 ft) above sea level. The city extends onto both banks of the Mureș river, however, the downtown area and the greater part of the districts are located on the left bank. The Cornești plateau (Hungarian: Somos-plateau) is the city's highest point (465 metres (1,526 ft) above sea level, co-ordinates: 46.5531°N 24.5984°E).

Târgu Mureș is 337 kilometres (209 mi) from Bucharest, 475 kilometres (295 mi) from Chișinău, 480 kilometres (300 mi) from Belgrade, 515 kilometres (320 mi) from Budapest, 598 kilometres (372 mi) from Sofia and 845 kilometres (525 mi) from Kyiv. It is surrounded by the following communes: Sângeorgiu de Mureș, Livezeni, Sântana de Mureș, Sâncraiu de Mureș, Corunca, Cristești and Ceuașu de Câmpie. Two villages, Mureșeni (Meggyesfalva) and Remetea (Remeteszeg), are administered by the city.

Distances between the city and some of the major cities in Romania:

- Bucharest: by rail 448 km (278 mi), by road 330 km (205 mi)
- Brașov by rail 282 km (175 mi), by road 168 km (104 mi)
- Constanța by rail 642 km (399 mi), by road 548 km (341 mi)
- Cluj-Napoca 127 km (79 mi) by rail, by road 101 km (63 mi)
- Iași by rail 505 km (314 mi), by road 310 km (193 mi)
- Sibiu by rail 189 km (117 mi), by road 112 km (70 mi)
- Timișoara by rail 344 km (214 mi), by road 327 km (203 mi)
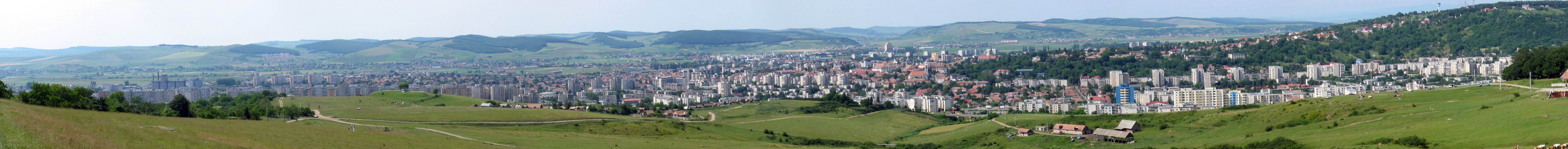
Panorama of the city

== Climate ==
Târgu Mureș has a continental climate characterised by warm dry summers and relatively cold winters. Winter temperatures are often below 0 °C (32 °F). Throughout the year there are 38 days with snow, and more than 60 days when the snow covers the ground. In summer, the average temperature is between 18 °C (64 °F) and 19 °C (66 °F) (the average for June, July and August), even though temperatures sometimes reach 36 °C (97 °F) during this period. On average, there are 143 days with precipitation over the course of the year, most frequently in December with 16 days and the least in August, September and October with 8 rainy days. The average annual temperature for Târgu Mureș is 8.6 °C (47 °F). The lowest temperature registered in the city is −32.8 °C (−27 °F), recorded in 1942 and 1963. The highest temperature, 39 °C (102 °F), was recorded in 1936.

Climate data for Târgu Mureș (elevation 310m, 2014–2026 normals, extremes 1830–present)
Month	Jan	Feb	Mar	Apr	May	Jun	Jul	Aug	Sep	Oct	Nov	Dec	Year
Record high °C (°F)	16.5 (61.7)	19.9 (67.8)	27.1 (80.8)	32.5 (90.5)	34.4 (93.9)	36.6 (97.9)	39.0 (102.2)	38.8 (101.8)	38.2 (100.8)	31.7 (89.1)	26.6 (79.9)	18.3 (64.9)	39.0 (102.2)
Mean daily maximum °C (°F)	2.8 (37.0)	7.1 (44.8)	12.7 (54.9)	17.6 (63.7)	21.9 (71.4)	27.2 (81.0)	28.7 (83.7)	29.5 (85.1)	24.1 (75.4)	17.4 (63.3)	10.1 (50.2)	4.5 (40.1)	17.0 (62.5)
Daily mean °C (°F)	−0.9 (30.4)	2.3 (36.1)	6.3 (43.3)	10.7 (51.3)	15.5 (59.9)	20.5 (68.9)	21.7 (71.1)	21.9 (71.4)	17.0 (62.6)	11.0 (51.8)	5.6 (42.1)	1.6 (34.9)	11.1 (52.0)
Mean daily minimum °C (°F)	−4.7 (23.5)	−2.5 (27.5)	-0.0 (32.0)	3.8 (38.8)	9.1 (48.4)	13.7 (56.7)	14.7 (58.5)	14.3 (57.7)	10.0 (50.0)	4.5 (40.1)	1.2 (34.2)	−1.4 (29.5)	5.2 (41.4)
Record low °C (°F)	−32.8 (−27.0)	−32.0 (−25.6)	−27.3 (−17.1)	−7.5 (18.5)	−3.7 (25.3)	0.0 (32.0)	4.6 (40.3)	4.1 (39.4)	−3.3 (26.1)	−8.4 (16.9)	−19.6 (−3.3)	−26.5 (−15.7)	−32.8 (−27.0)
Average precipitation mm (inches)	28.0 (1.10)	30.4 (1.20)	33.4 (1.31)	46.0 (1.81)	71.4 (2.81)	89.0 (3.50)	60.4 (2.38)	62.9 (2.48)	47.4 (1.87)	39.9 (1.57)	41.6 (1.64)	32.8 (1.29)	583.2 (22.96)
Average precipitation days (≥ 1.0 mm)	7.6	7.5	7.4	6.8	10.2	10.2	8.8	6.8	7.2	6.9	7.7	7.4	94.5
Mean monthly sunshine hours	59.4	92.5	147.3	185.9	241.3	252.2	270.6	262.4	184.9	154.1	83.4	48.8	1,982.8
Source 1: Adaptări la schimbările climatice în regiunea 07 Centru (sun 1981-2010); ANM
Source 2: Meteomanz

== Demographics ==
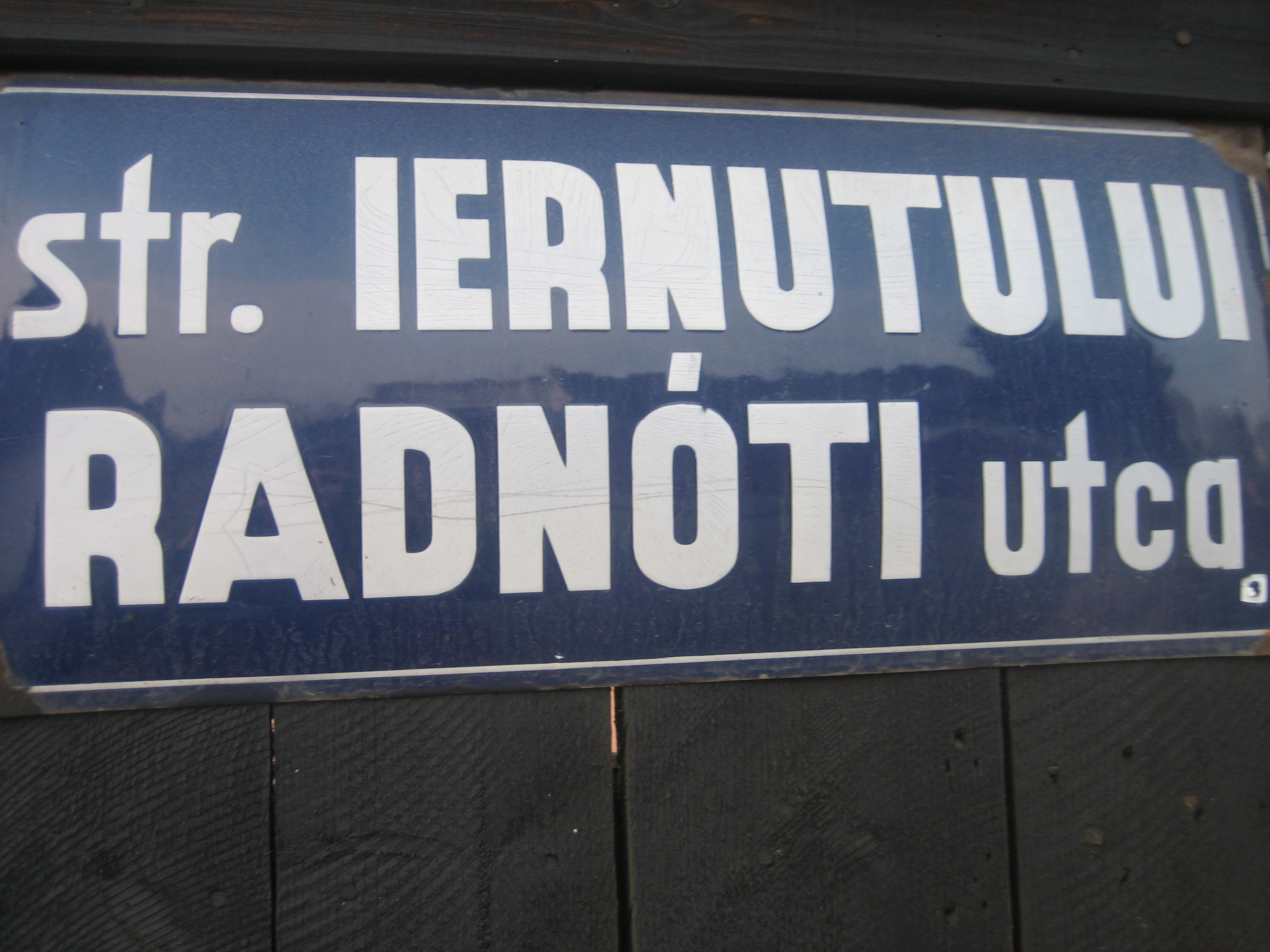
Bilingual street sign

According to the 2021 census, Târgu Mureș had a population of 116,033, a decrease from the figure recorded at the 2011 census. The city is home to the largest urban Hungarian community in Transylvania, surpassing those of Sfântu Gheorghe, Cluj-Napoca and Oradea. The 2002 census was the first to show the Hungarians as a local minority. The city is officially bilingual and both Romanian and Hungarian languages are recognised as official and used in public signage, education, justice and access to public administration; however, in case of commercial signage and advertisements, the bilingual signage is usually used only by Hungarian-owned companies. Roma people make up 2.97% of the city's population, which is considerably lower than their proportion of 9.68% in Mureș County.

Ethnic composition of Târgu Mureș (2021)
1. Romanians (54.8%)
2. Hungarians (41.8%)
3. Romani (2.97%)
4. Germans (Transylvanian Saxons) (0.12%)
5. Jews (0.04%)
6. Others (0.21%)
Religious composition of Târgu Mureș (2021)
1. Romanian Orthodox (48.7%)
2. Reformed (27.0%)
3. Roman Catholics (12.7%)
4. Unitarians (2.50%)
5. Greek Catholics (2.44%)
6. Jehovah's Witnesses (1.29%)
7. Others (3.56%)
8. Irreligious, atheist and agnostic (1.86%)

=== Ethnic communities ===
Ethnic structure evolution from 1850 until 2021:

Year	Total	Romanians	Hungarians	Germans	Jews	Roma	Others
1850	7,855	6.0%	82.6%	3.1%	2.6%	3.6%	2.1%
1869	12,678	5.2%	88.9%	3.5%	n.a.	n.a.	2.4%
1900	20,229	11.6%	83.3%	3.6%	n.a.	n.a.	1.5%
1910	25,517	6.7.%	89.3%	2.4%	n.a.	n.a.	1.6%
1930	40,058	26.7%	57.2%	1.7%	12.1%	1.1%	1.2%
1966	86,464	28.3%	70.9%	0.6%	n.a.	n.a.	0.2%
1977	127,783	34.8%	63.6%	0.6%	0.4%	0.5%	0.1%
1992	164,445	46.1%	51.4%	0.3%	0.1%	2%	0.1%
2002	149,577	50.4%	46.7%	0.2%	n.a.	2.4%	0.3%
2011	134,290	51.9%	45.2%	0.2%	0.1%	2.4%	0.1%
2021	116,033	54.8%	41.8%	0.1%	0.0%	3.0%	0.2%

== Economy ==
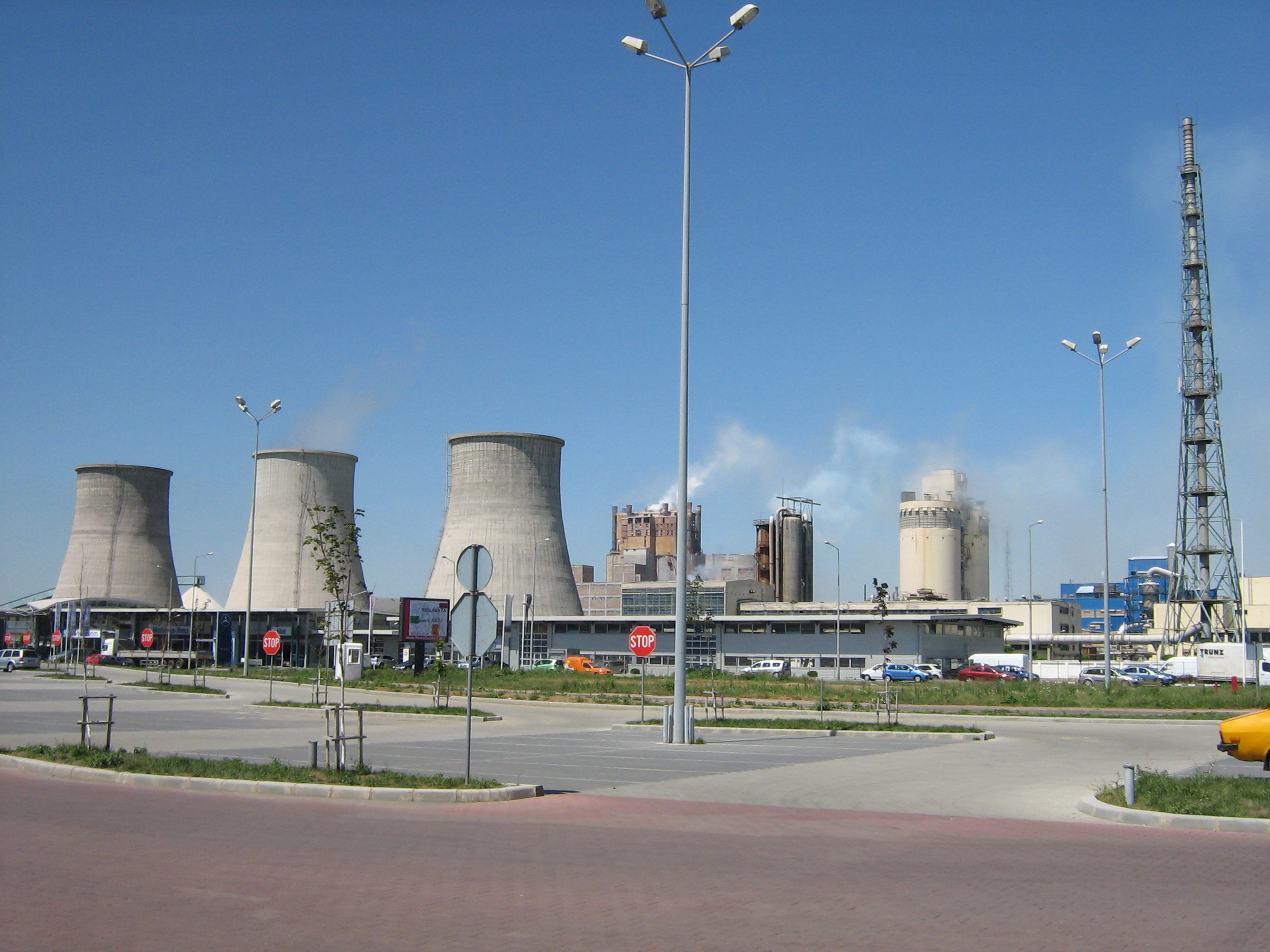
Azomureș industrial plant

At present in Târgu Mureș there are over 8,500 private companies and several state-owned companies.

The various industrial sectors are:

- Chemical industry (Azomureș)
- Pharmaceutical industry
- Food industry:
  - Bread industry (Mopan)
  - Dairy industry
- Wood industry
- Textile industry

== Districts of the city ==
Districts of the city in Romanian

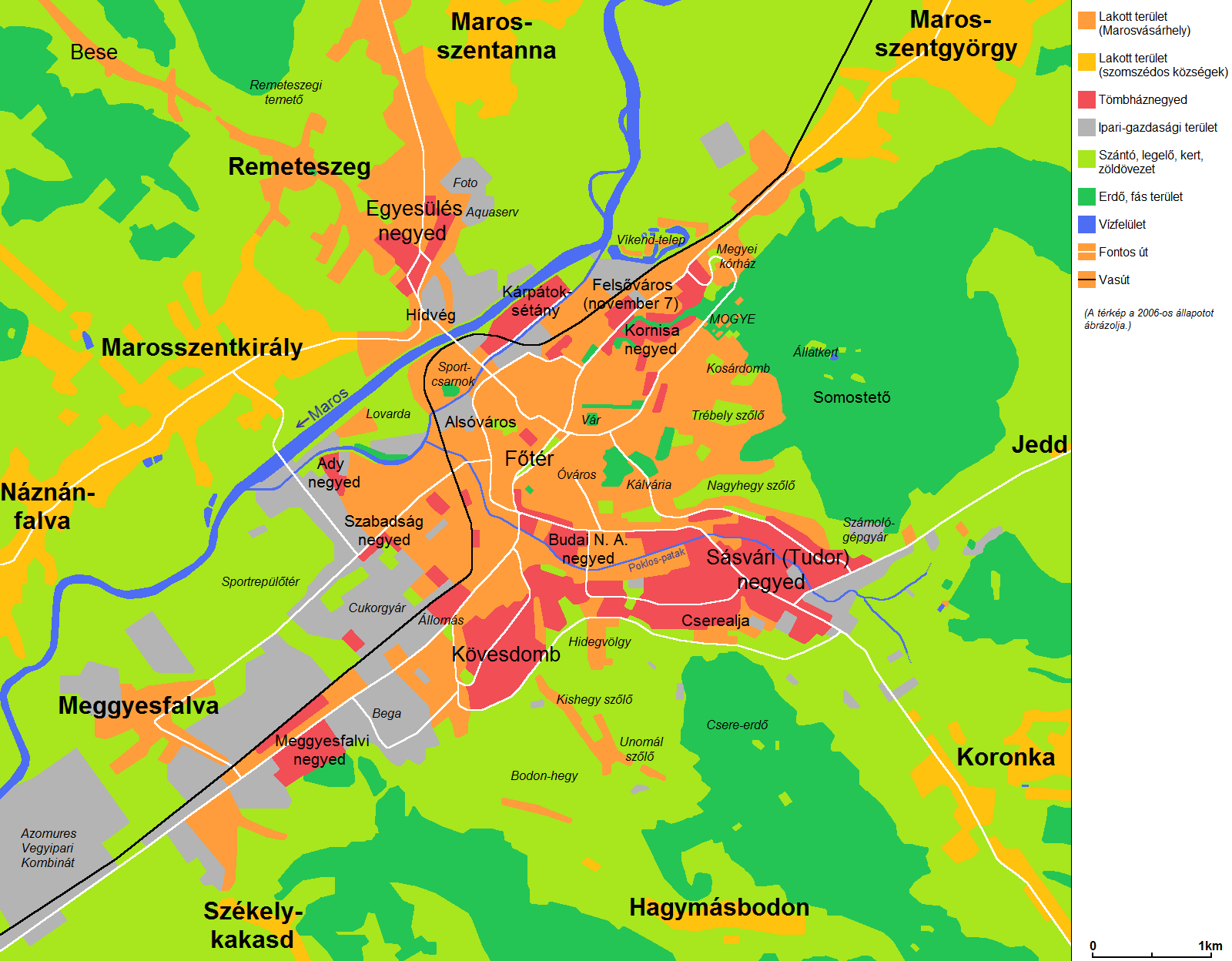
Districts of the city in Hungarian

in Romanian	in Hungarian
Centru	Főtér
Dâmbul Pietros (1848)	Kövesdomb (1848)
Unirii (on the right of the Mureș River)	Egyesülés (i.e. Benefalva and Hídvég villages on the right of the Mureș River)
Rovinari	Ady Endre
Aleea Carpați	Kárpátok sétánya
Budai Nagy Antal	Budai Nagy Antal
Gară	Állomás
Livezeni	Jedd
22 Decembrie 1989 (7 Noiembrie)	1989 December 22 (7 November)
Tudor Vladimirescu	Tudor Vladimirescu
Răsăritului	Kikelet
Mureșeni	Meggyesfalva
Substejăriș	Cserealja
Cornișa	Párkány
Valea Rece	Hidegvölgy

== Personalities ==
Many personalities have been born or lived in the city and helped shape it in different fields:

Natives
- Tamás Borsos (1566–after 1633)
- Petru Maior (1756–1821)
- Elek Dósa (1803–1867)
- Farkas Deák (1832–1888)
- Vasile Hossu (1866–1916)
- Gyula Vályi (1855–1913)
- Gyula Ostenburg-Moravek (1884–1944)
- József Molnár (1907–1983)
- József Dudás (1912–1957)
- Sergiu Al-George (1922–1981)
- Alexandru Imre (born 1924)
- Tibor Diamantstein (1925–1995)
- Zoltán Nuridsány (1925–1974)
- Irina Klimovschi (1936–2001)
- Boldizsár Csiky (born 1937)
- Ferenc Asztalos (born 1945)
- Gabriel Herman (born 1947)
- Rozalia Șooș (born 1947)
- György Frunda (born 1951)
- László Bölöni (born 1953)
- Maria Mailat (born 1953)
- Géza Szőcs (1953–2020)
- László Borbély (born 1954)
- Radu Filipescu (born 1955)
- Gábor Tompa (born 1957)
- Ildikó Keresztes (born 1964)
- Ada Milea (born 1975)
- Kata Tisza (born 1980)
- ADDA (born 1992)
- Bernadette Szőcs (born 1995)
- Ilinca Băcilă (born 1998)
- Filip Ugran (born 2002)
Residents
- János Baranyai Decsi (1560–1601)
- Péter Csokás (d. 1587)
- Péter Apor (1676–1752)
- György Aranka (1737–1817)
- Sámuel Teleki (1739–1832)
- Gheorghe Șincai (1754–1816)
- Farkas Bolyai (1775–1856)
- János Bolyai (1802–1860)
- Avram Iancu (1824–1872)
- Alexandru Papiu Ilarian (1827–1877)
- György Bernády (1864–1938)
- Károly Molter (1890–1981)
- Aurel Filimon (1891–1940)
- Emil Dandea (1893–1969)
- János Kemény (1903–1971)
- Márton Izsák (1913–2004)
- Loránd Lohinszky (1925–2013)
- András Sütő (1927–2006)
- Romulus Guga (1939–1983)
- György Orbán (born 1947)
- Raed Arafat (born 1964)

== Main sights ==
=== Places of worship ===
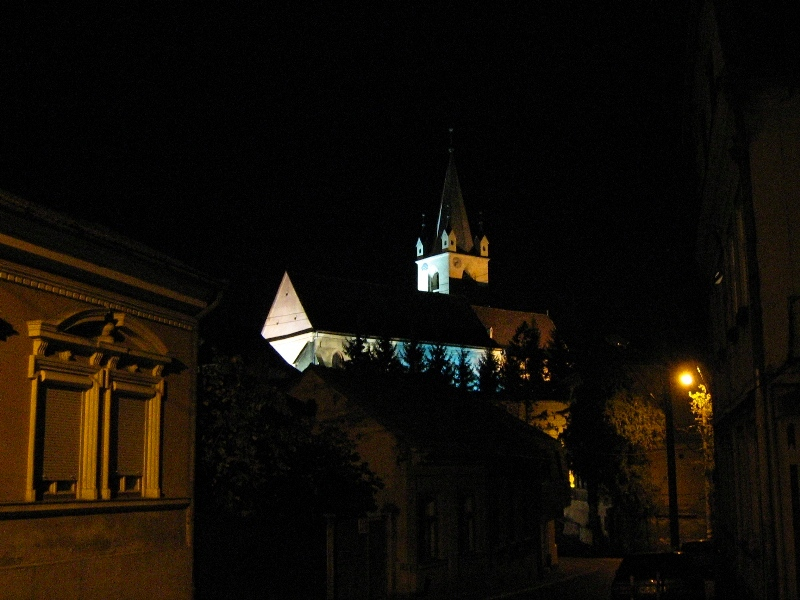
The Fortress Church is the oldest church in the town

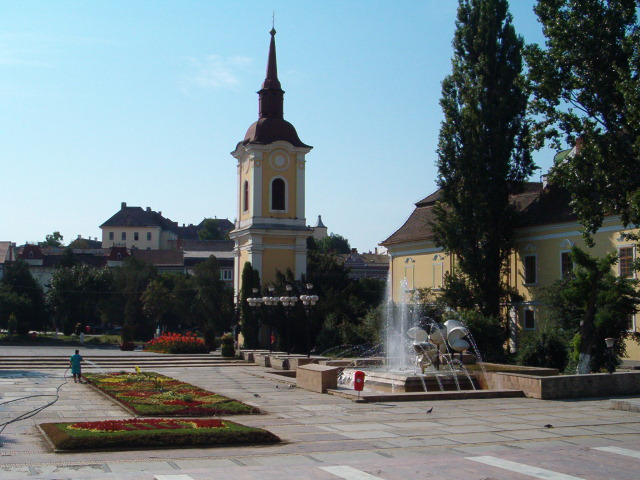
The Grey Friars' church was demolished by the communist regime in 1971, with only the tower remaining (pictured)

The Reformed Fortress Church is the oldest church in the town. According to historical evidence, less than a century had passed after the first appearance of the Franciscan order in Transylvania, Hungarian Kingdom, that the Franciscan friars arrived at Vásárhely. The building of the church took an entire century, from the middle of the 14th century until the middle of the 15th and it consisted of a monastery building, an older chapel, the church and the steeple. The church was finalized between 1400 and 1450. The church may have been originally decorated with frescos, as traces of mural paintings were found inside. The almost complete disappearance of these paintings is due to the fact that the church became the property of Protestant believers in 1557. The religious reform required for churches to have no paintings, statues or religious frescos.

The existence of the Franciscan order in Vásárhely was directly affected by the religious reform which was largely spread in Transylvania during the 16th century. In 1557, the influence of the Reformed Church over the Hungarians in the town was so strong that it eventually led to the confiscation of the properties of Catholic monastic orders. Franciscan friars, who until that time had been attending the church in the fortress, were forced to leave town. They returned after nearly two centuries when the political climate had become favorable to Catholicism due to the instauration of the Habsburgs in Transylvania. They bought the land in the center of the town where they built a new church and monastery by 1777. The tower, the only part that is still standing, was added to the church's façade in 1802 by architect János Topler. In 1971 the municipality decided to demolish the monastery to create the necessary space for the construction of the National Theater and the square in front of it. A new church was built in 1972 for the Franciscans on Libertății street.

At the beginning of the 18th century, one of the most representative Baroque churches of Transylvania was built in the town. St John the Baptist Church was erected in the North-Eastern part of the city center and belongs to the Roman Catholic parish. The inside of the church is luxurious, with liturgical objects that are true works of art. The main altar, made in 1755 by Anton Schuchbauer and Johannes Nachtigal is of monumental dimensions and has a pseudo-architectural structure. The paintings of the altars in the lateral chapels: Saint Ladislaus I of Hungary, Saint Joseph, Saint John of Nepomuc, Holy Cross belong to the same Michael Angelo Unterberger. The stained glass windows made by the Türke Company of Grottau were installed in 1898.

The Great Synagogue (also known as the Big Synagogue) was built between 1899 and 1900 at the initiative of the Jewish community "Status Quo". The design of the building was drawn up by Gartner Jacob from Vienna and the construction works were coordinated by the Hungarian Pál Soós. The entire edifice is dominated by the central cupola. Each side of the central spire is decorated with a floral rosette similar to the ones on the façade. This type of window is also used several times on the lateral façades. The vast interior is richly decorated, both with shapes and color. The synagogue has 314 seats on the ground floor and 238 on the top floor. The most recent large scale remodeling of the building took place in 2000 when the walls were reinforced and the interior decoration was re-done.

The existence of the Unitarian faith in the town is linked to the name of Ferenc Dávid, founder of Unitarianism and the first Unitarian bishop. The political circumstances in Transylvania became favourable for Ferenc Dávid's activity as the Diet of Torda held between 1557 and 1568 granted freedom of faith to all religions in Transylvania. The Unitarianism became religio-recepta together with all the other Protestant faiths. The king of the state himself, John II Sigismund Zápolya became Unitarian. The Unitarian Church was built between 1929 and 1930 next to the old Unitarian prayer house dating from 1869.

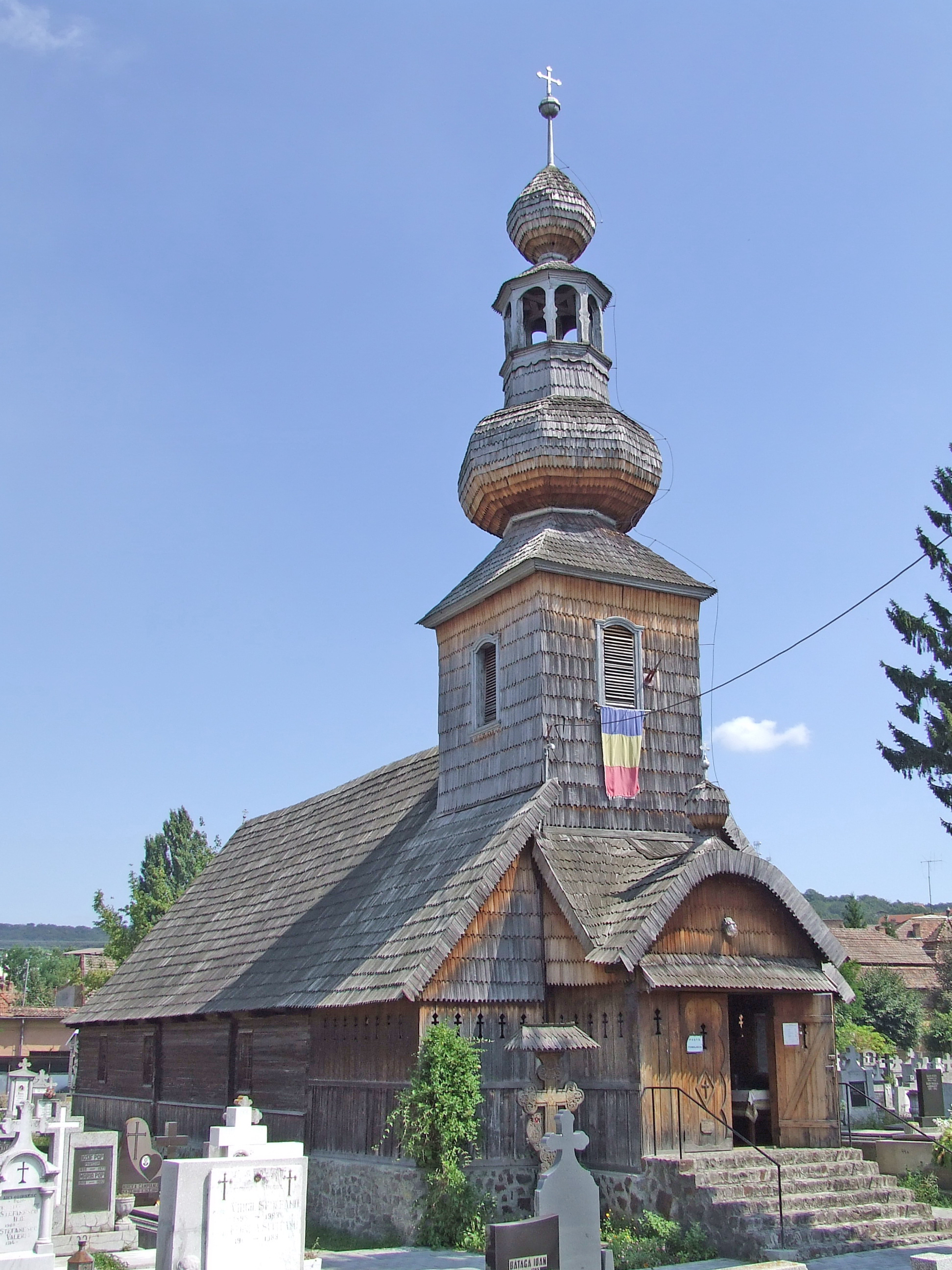
Saint Michael Wooden Orthodox Church (1793)

Ascension of the Lord Orthodox Cathedral (1934)

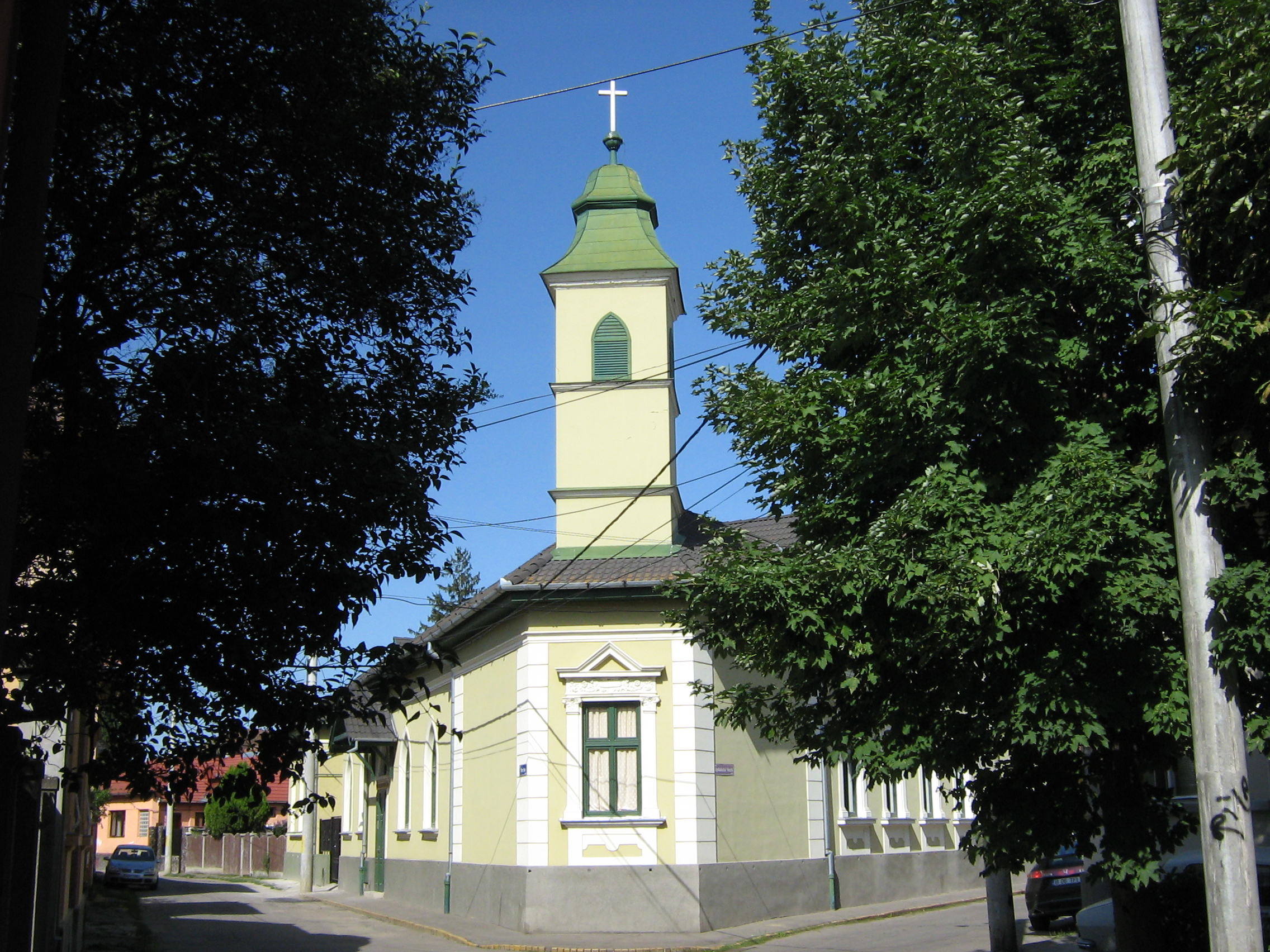
Evangelical Church

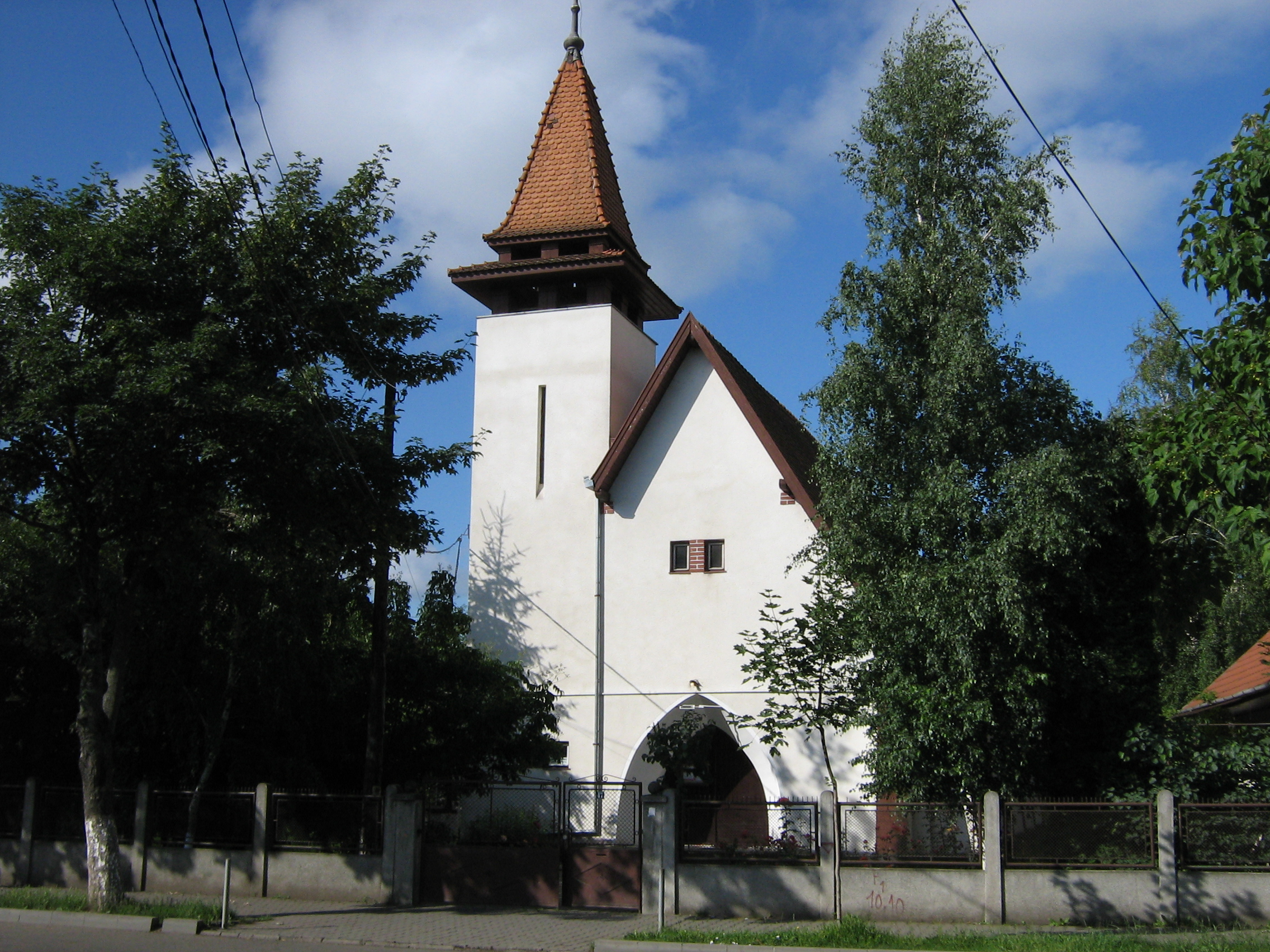
Reformed Church on Liberty Street (1937)

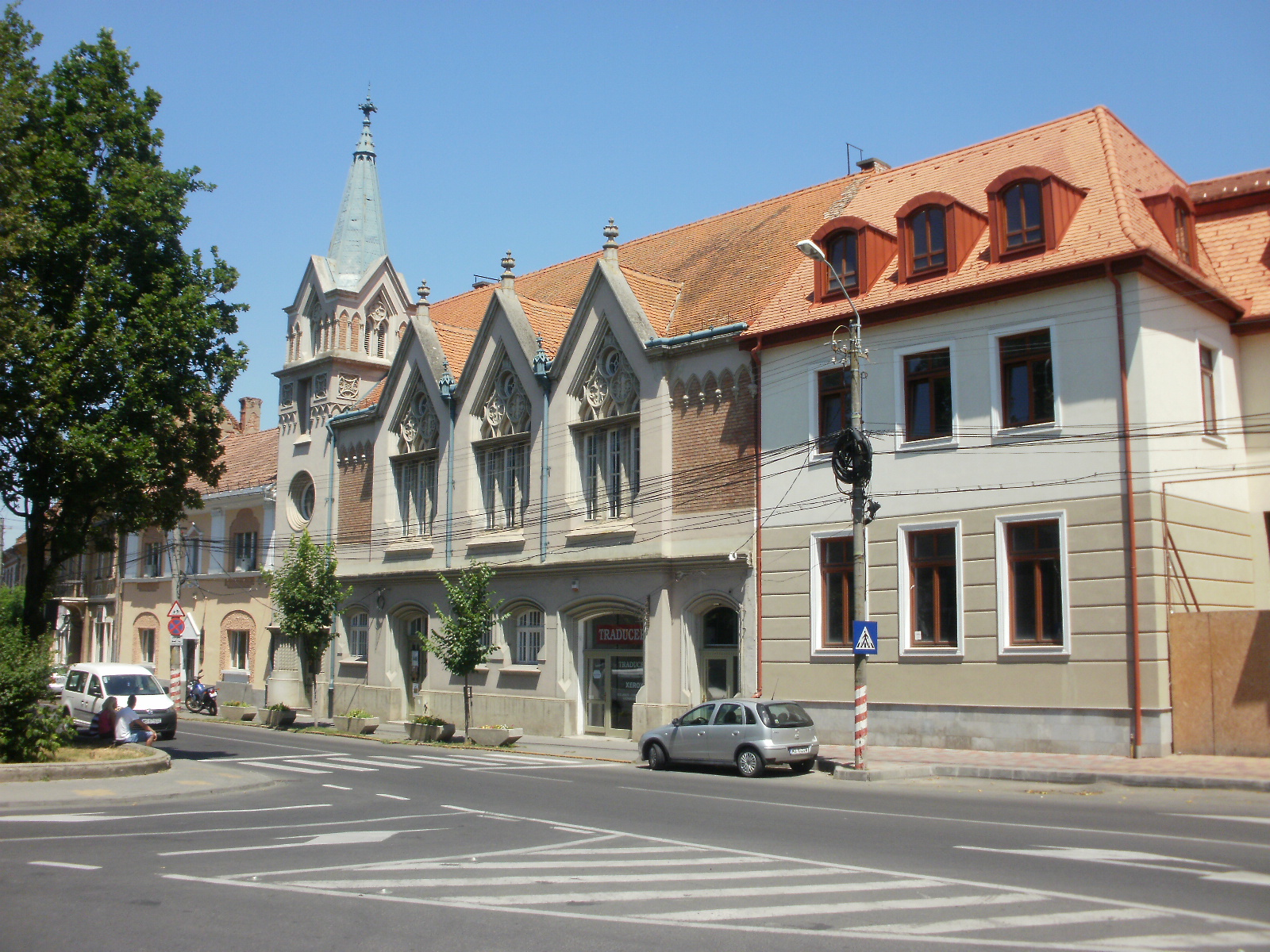
Unitarian Church on Bolyai Street (1931)

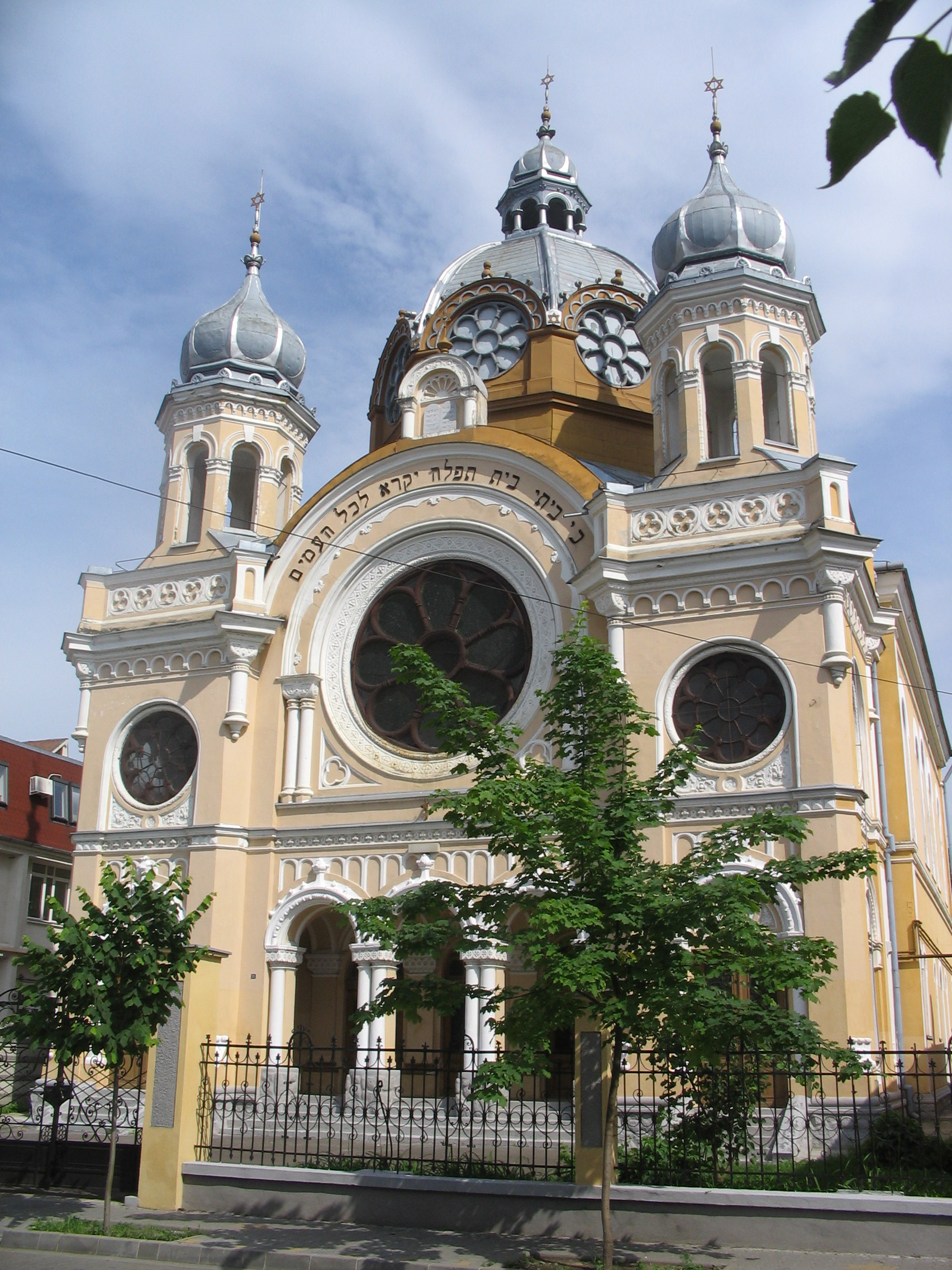
Status Quo Synagogue (1900)

=== Other sights ===
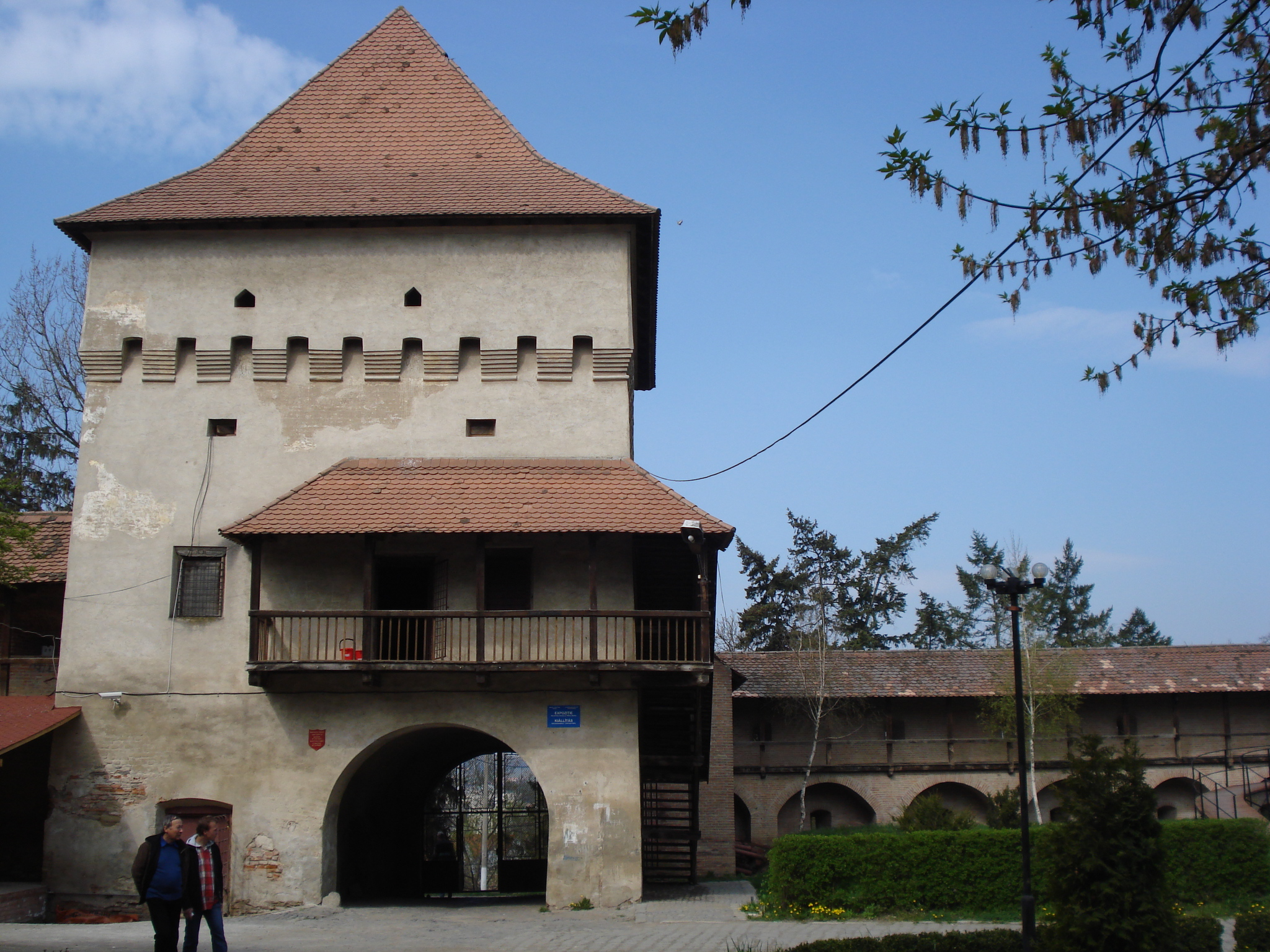
Back of the entrance to the City Fortress

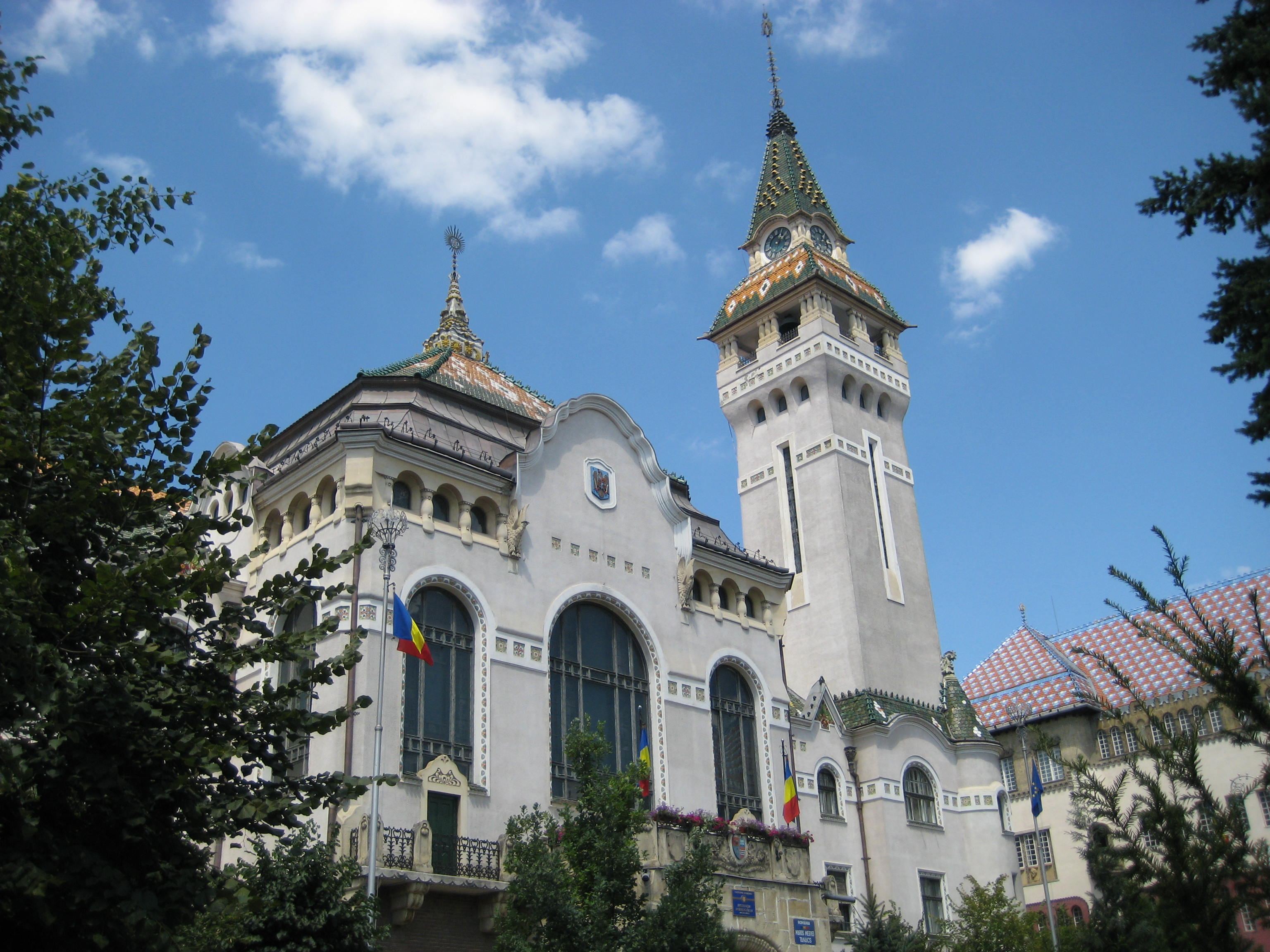
The old City Hall is now the residence of the Mureș County Council.

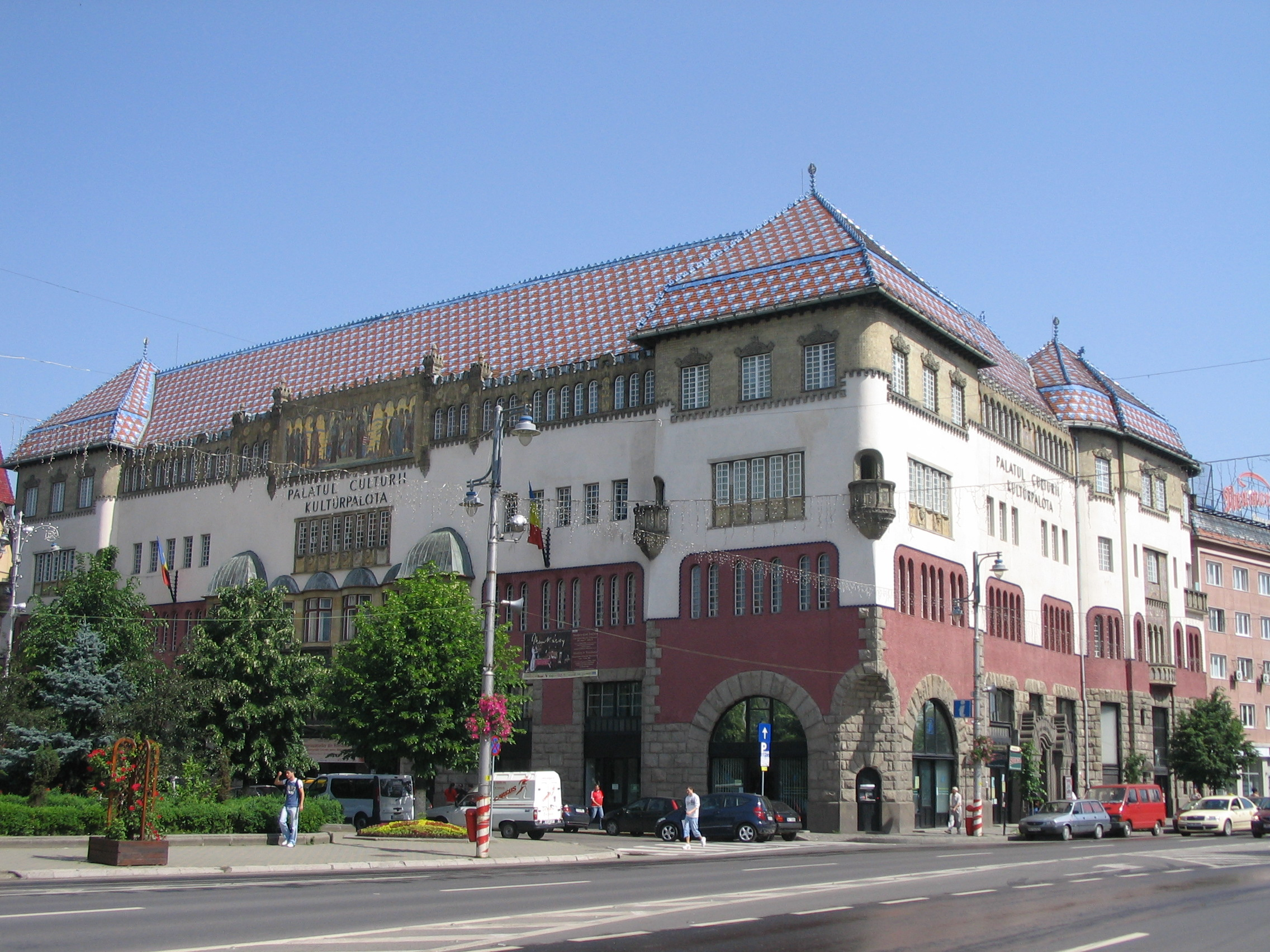
The Palace of Culture was built between 1911 and 1913.

The first fortress in the town was erected in 1492 upon order of voivode Stephen Báthory, and was accomplished somewhere between 1602 and 1652 under judge Tamás Borsos. Having a pentagon plan, surrounded by a defense wall, the Citadel has seven forts, five of them bearing the names of the guild which – according to tradition – supported its maintenance: the leather dressers', the tailors', the butchers', the ironmongers', the coopers'. After the Citadel was taken over by the Austrian troops, it became the headquarters of the military garrison based in the town. In the meantime the Baroque style building was built (on the left hand side of the road in front of the entrance gate) and in the second half of the 18th century the construction works of the "barkey" were started, an addition finished in the 19th century. On the occasion of the Târgu Mureș days – which have as central point of performance the Citadel – a museum center was opened in the gate fort (erected in 1613) presenting the history of the town and of the Citadel.

The Teleki-Bolyai Library is a historic public library and current museum in the town. One of the richest Transylvanian collections of cultural artefacts, it was founded by the Hungarian Count Sámuel Teleki in 1802, at the time when Transylvania was part of the Habsburg monarchy, and has been open to the reading public ever since. It was among the first institutions of its kind inside the Habsburg-ruled Kingdom of Hungary. It houses over 200,000 volumes, of which many are rarities, constituting a comprehensive scientific database. The book collection is divided into several smaller libraries, of which the two main donations are the original 40,000-volume Teleki Library and the 80,000-volume Bolyai Library; the rest, grouped as the Miscellaneous Collection, is made up of several private libraries, volumes previously held by religious schools and those of a Franciscan friary. Overall, the library constitutes a collection of most traditional types of Transylvanian book.

The old City Hall was built in 1906–1907 after the construction plans of Márcell Komor and Dezső Jakab. The entrance area, including the corridor and the staircase leading to the first floor, is the most representative in this regard. The ribbed stellar vaults that cover this area were inspired by Gothic architecture. The vaults are supported by columns with composite caps, and the keystone is a large floral shape which includes the lighting appliance. The vaults are painted with spiraling vegetal motifs. Elements of the front hall include the stone bench with its legs shaped as those of an animal and with wing-shaped handles. Its shell-shaped, golden back has a shield flanked by two volutes on its upper side. Features of the monumental staircase leading to the first floor include the upper side of the banister resembling a slithering animal or a wave. The exterior decoration is simpler and is based on Hungarian-Székely folk motives made of polychromatic ceramics. The ground floor is marked by a solid, embossed pedestal. Windows with large openings tend to be predominant in the façade. The three semicircular windows in the middle area of the façade are those of the honor hall that has a double elevation with respect to the other rooms. The glass paintings which illustrated Gábor Bethlen, Francis II Rákóczi, Lajos Kossuth, Ferenc Deák and Franz Joseph I of Austria are missing from the halls.

The Palace of Culture is a remarkable construction in the city center. It was built upon initiative of the mayor of the town, György Bernády. Building works started in the spring of 1911. They contributed to the establishment of the distinctively flavored Hungarian Art Nouveau school in Transylvania by their works in Deva and Oradea. The plan is an irregular rectangle, with protuberances on the sides and at the extremities. The building has five floors: a tall ground floor, a mezzanine and three floors differentiated by the use of various construction materials. The façades are characterized by bi-dimensionality and by a liniar-rectangular style, with only a few curvilinear elements: the six bow-windows covered by semi-caps above the main portal and the circular balconies on the edges. The main entrance is in the middle of the façade on Enescu street and is made up of four massive doors, protected by an architectural element made of glass and with an iron framing. This element, as well as the doors decorated with iron floral motifs are typical for the early 20th century style. The exterior is richly decorated, with colored mosaic panels, with relieved scenes and busts of Hungarians. The mosaic on the main façade is an allegorical scene inspired by the Hungarian folklore. The cardboards were made by Nagy Sándor, a Hungarian artist, who founded with Körösföy Kriesch Aladár the School of Gödöllő. The art is characterized by bi-dimensionality and vertical rhythmicalness. Most of the mosaics and stained glass windows were authored by Róth Miksa, particularly those on the side facing Square.

The city skyline can be seen from Cornești Heights [in Hungarian: Somostető].

== Culture ==
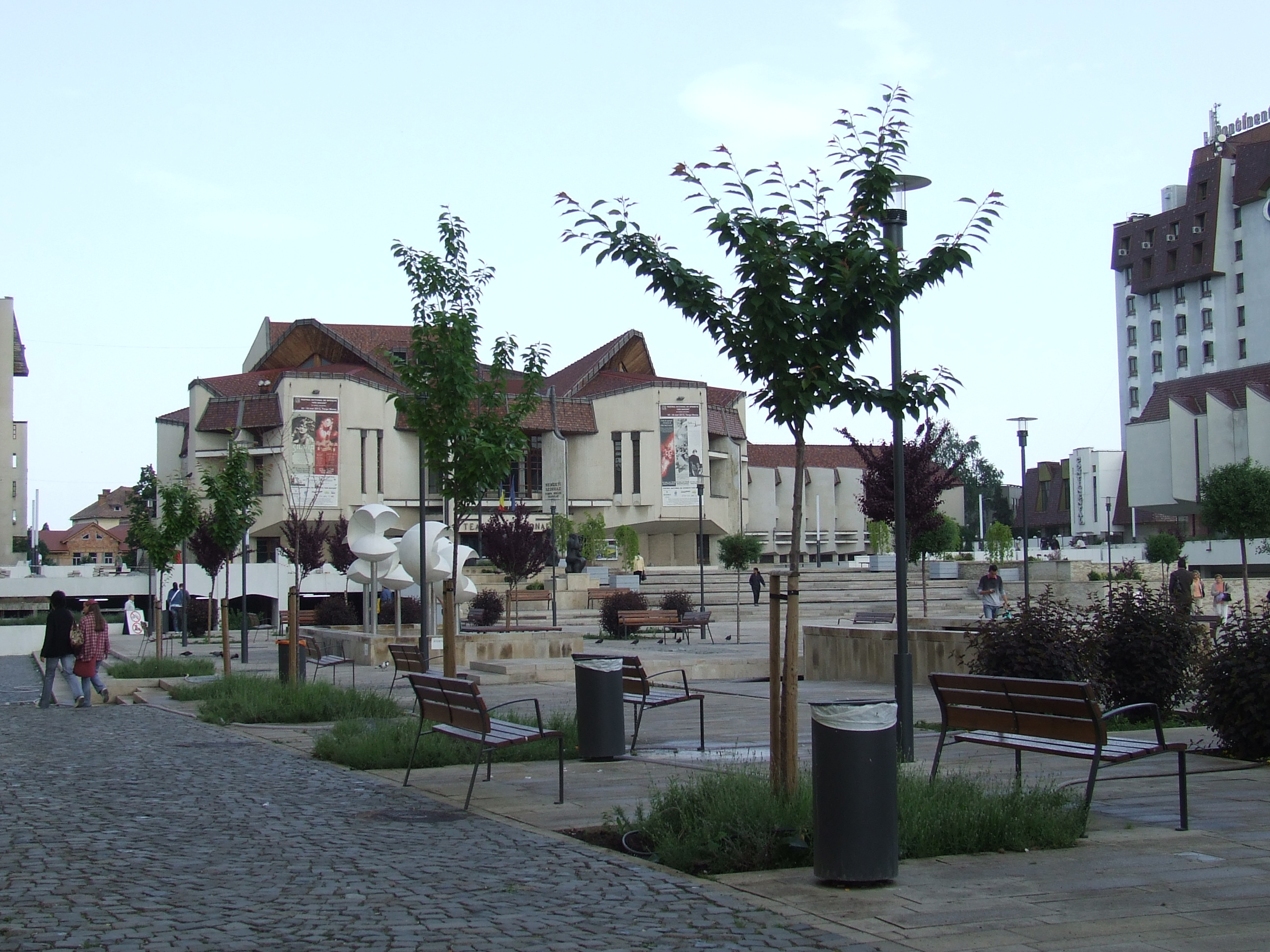
The National Theatre built in 1973

Târgu Mures is home to the Palace of Culture concert hall which is situated in the heart of the city. Weekly classical concerts are performed here by the Târgu Mureș State Philharmonic Orchestra.

On the other side of the city center is the Târgu Mureș National Theater with two companies, Tompa Miklós (performances in Hungarian language) and Liviu Rebreanu (performances in Romanian language). Beside the main companies, there are also alternative underground theater companies called Yorick Studio and Teatru 74.

The city was home to the Peninsula / Félsziget Festival, Romania's former biggest music festival.

== Politics ==
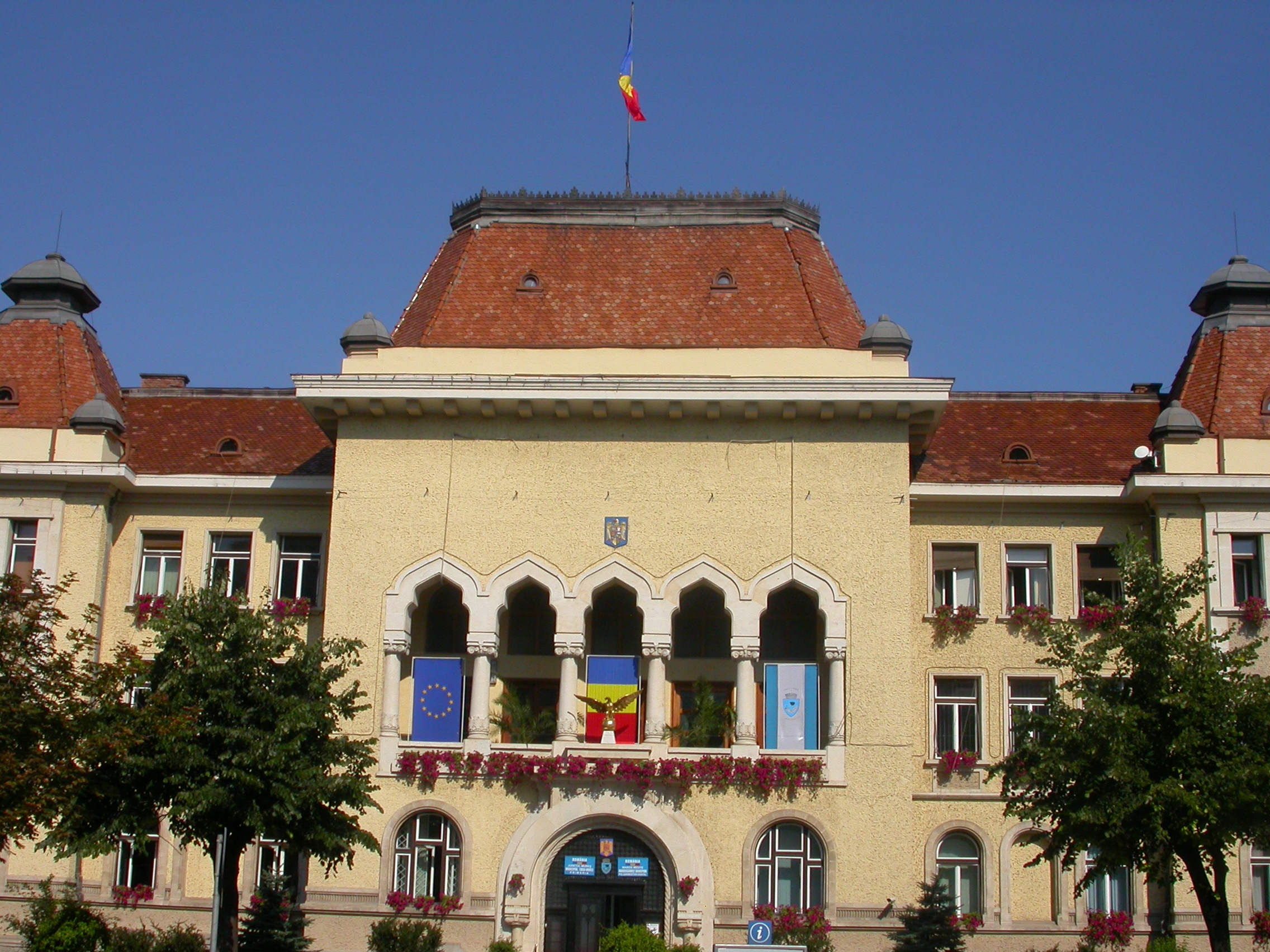
Târgu Mureș City Hall in 2007

=== Mayor ===
Party	Name	Term
Independent, supported by the UDMR	Zoltán Soós	2024–2028
Independent, supported by the UDMR	Zoltán Soós	2020–2024
Independent	Dorin Florea	2016–2020
PDL and PNL	Dorin Florea	2012–2016
PDL	Dorin Florea	2008–2012
Independent	Dorin Florea	2004–2008
PNȚ-CD	Dorin Florea	2000–2004
UDMR	Imre Fodor	1996-2000
UDMR	Győző Nagy	1992-1996

Dorin Florea had three investigations from National Anticorruption Directorate (DNA) and did not run for another term in 2020.

In 2016, Dorin Florea obtained 42.95% of votes and won against Soós Zoltán (40.23%).

In 2020, Zoltán Soós obtained 50.53% of the vote (considerably more than supported UDMR for the local council: 44.57%). The runner-up obtained 17.06%.

=== Local Council ===
The local Municipal Assembly has 23 members:

Party / Seats in Local Council (Percentage of votes)	2024 Elections	2020 Elections
Democratic Alliance of Hungarians in Romania (UDMR/RMDSZ)	10 (41.35%)	11 (44.57%)
Social Democratic Party (PSD)	6 (21.60%)	2 (7.43%)
National Liberal Party (PNL)	3 (12.87%)	4 (15.29%)
Alliance for the Union of Romanians (AUR)	2 (8.53%)	0 (1.3%)
POL (Party of Free People – regional party)	2 (6.63%)	2 (7.18%)

2020-2024 Councillors

Party / Seats in Local Council (Percentage of votes)	2016 Elections	2020 Elections
Democratic Alliance of Hungarians in Romania (UDMR/RMDSZ)	10 (38.30%)	11 (44.57%)
National Liberal Party (PNL)	6 (21.19%)	4 (15.29%)
Social Democratic Party (PSD)	4 (16.84%)	2 (7.43%)
POL (Party of Free People – regional party)	3 (10.61%)	2 (7.18%)
PRO Romania (PRO)	—N/a	2 (7.16%)
People's Movement Party (PMP)	—N/a	2 (6.98%)

Turnout at the 2016 elections was 50.87% and in 2020 was 45.92% of the total registered voters.

== Education ==
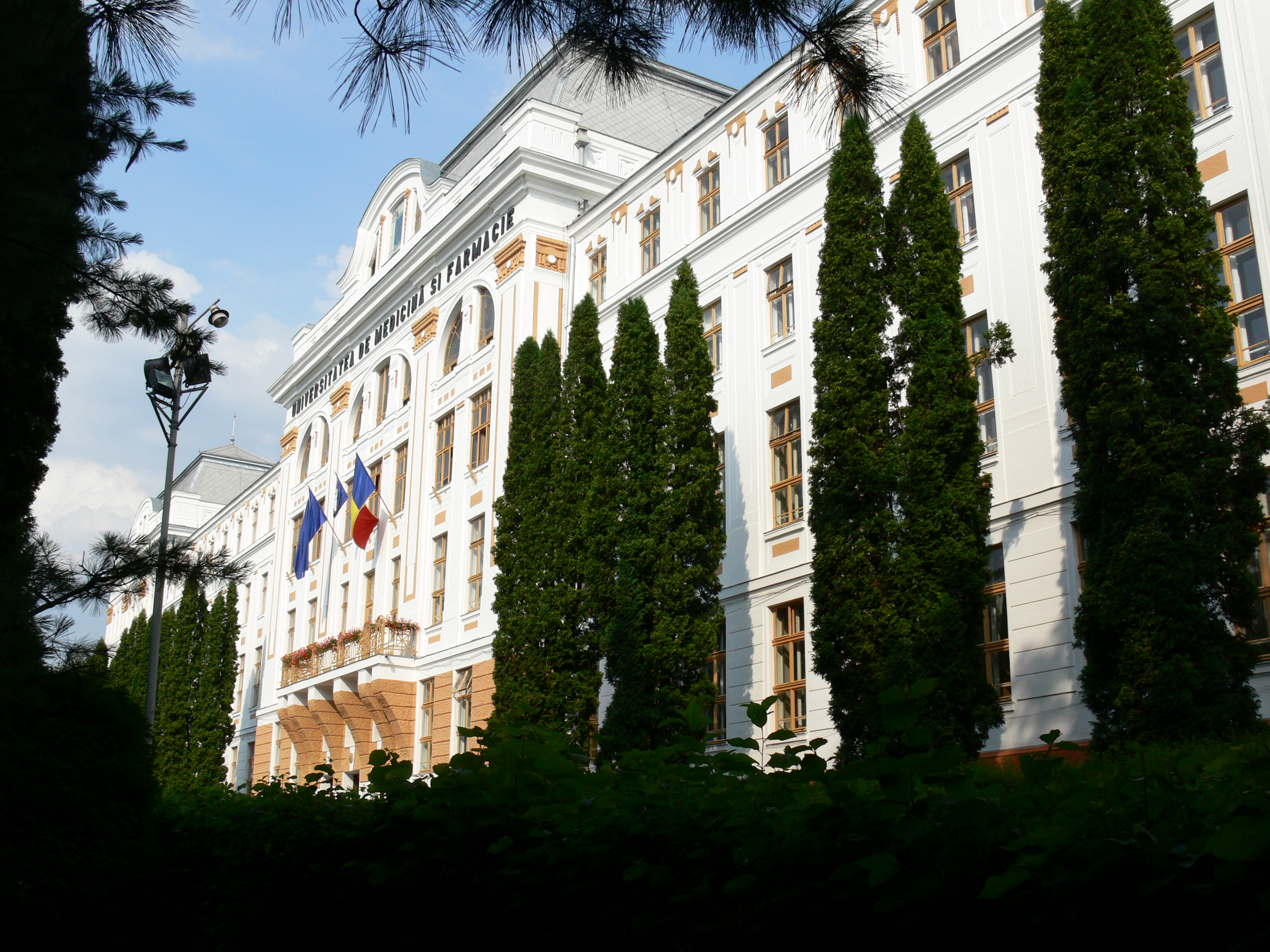
Faculties of Medicine and Pharmacy of the UMFST

Târgu Mureș is an important centre for general and higher education. The most important high schools are the Alexandru Papiu Ilarian National College, Unirea National College and the Hungarian-speaking Bolyai Farkas Elméleti Líceum. The latter is a continuator of the traditions of the Schola Particula, established in Târgu Mureș in 1557, and of the Reformed College banished from Sárospatak at the beginning of the 18th century. The establishment was one of the first schools of the Reformed Church in Transylvania, was first working in the old building of the Franciscan friary in the fortress, and had Baranyai Decsi Czimor János, Tordai Ádám, Laskói Csókás Péter as teachers, as well as others. After being sacked in 1601 and 1602, the Schola was moved into another building, on the place of the present high school. For centuries it had accommodated the Reformed College and the present high school. The present aspect was acquired at the end of the 19th and the beginning of the 20th century. The main statue, facing Bolyai square was erected following the design of architect Baumgarten Sándor in 1908–1909, in Hungarian Secession style. Târgu Mureș also has a "School of Arts" (in Romanian Liceul de Artă; in Hungarian Művészeti Líceum) which was set up in 1949. The school offers young musicians and children interested in graphic arts the best education in the county. Along the book-learning, the children attend music theory classes, musical instruments (violin, piano, violoncello, viola, double bass, flute, harp, trumpet, tube, trombone, bassoon, clarinet, oboe, horn, percussion instruments etc.) and graphic arts classes.

Renowned public universities like the University of Medicine, Pharmacy, Science and Technology (UMFST) (founded in 1945) and University of Arts (1946) account for more than 10,000 students. Other universities are the Sapientia University (2001), a private institution of Hungarian higher education in Transylvania, and Dimitrie Cantemir University (1991).

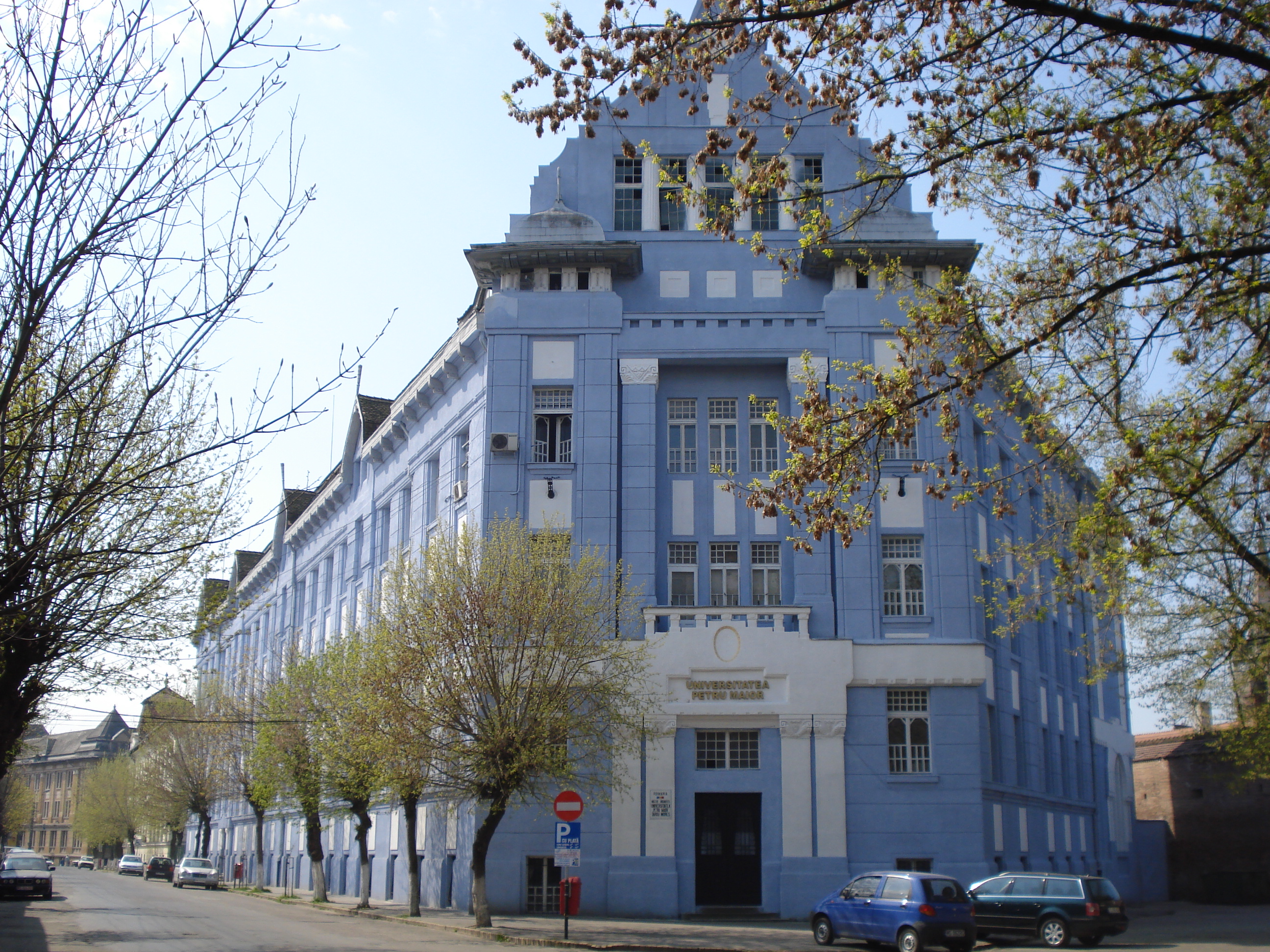
Faculty of Engineering and Information Technology and Faculty of Sciences and Letters of the UMFST

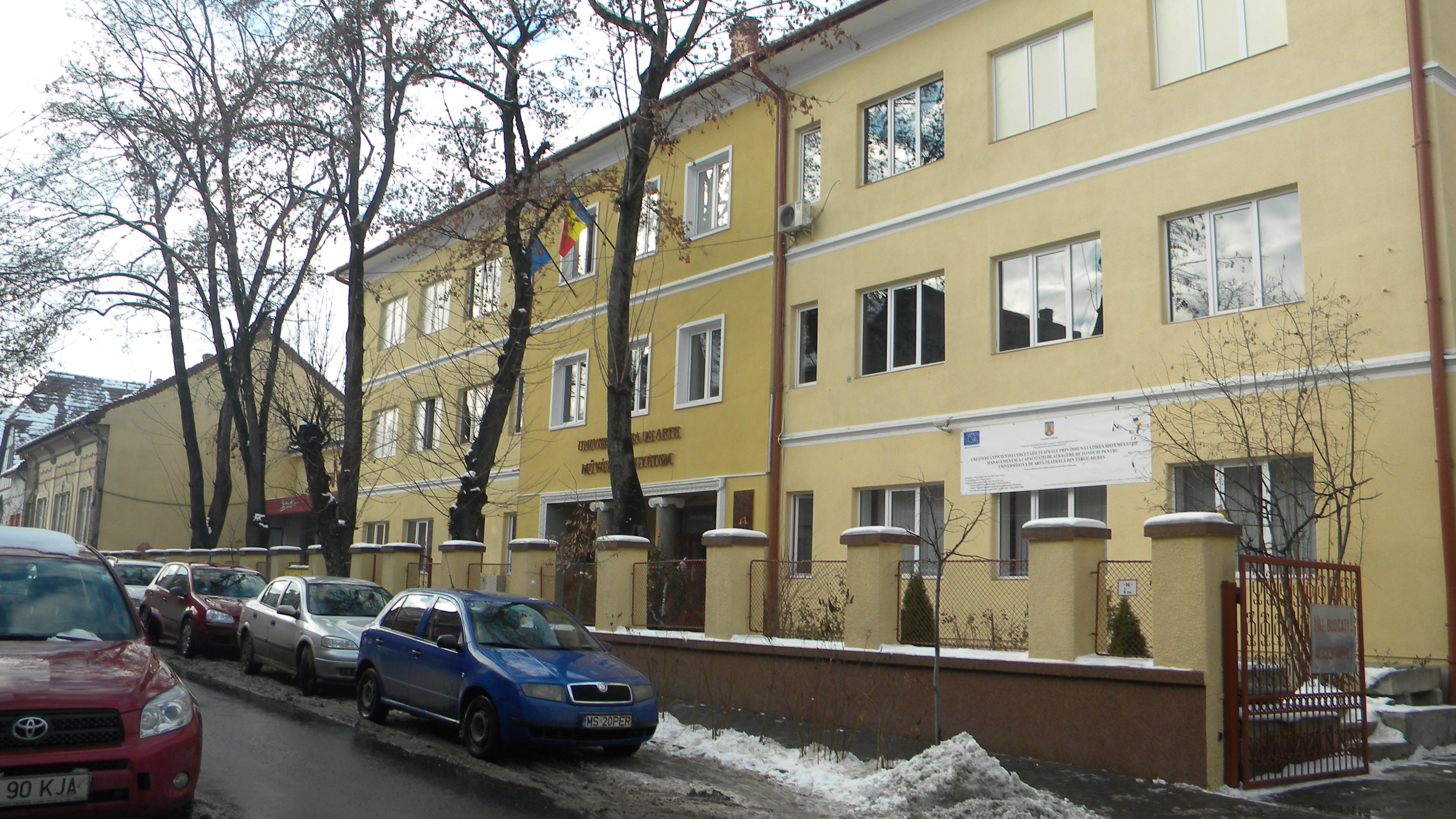
University of Arts

Alexandru Papiu Ilarian National College

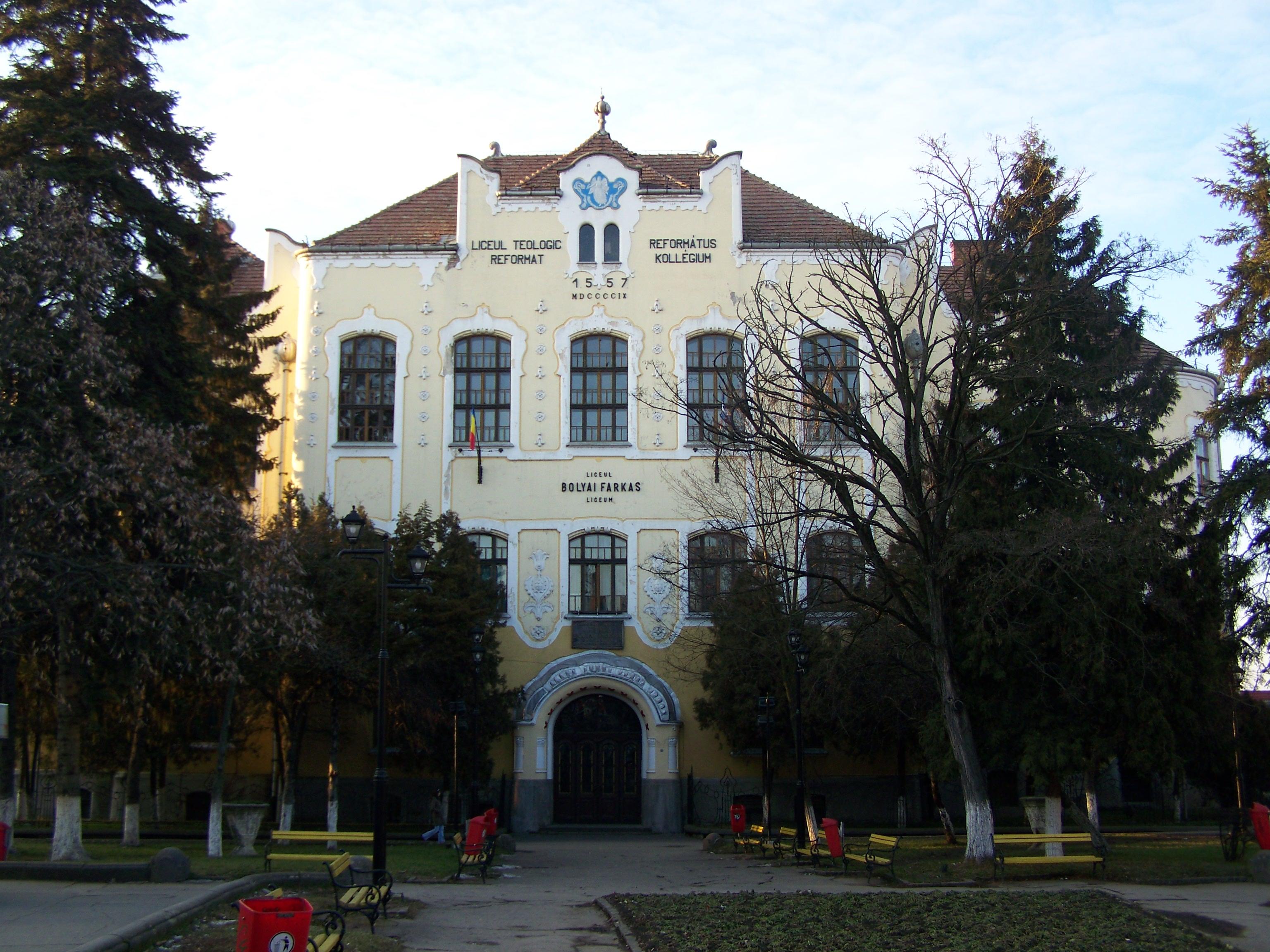
Bolyai Farkas Elméleti Líceum

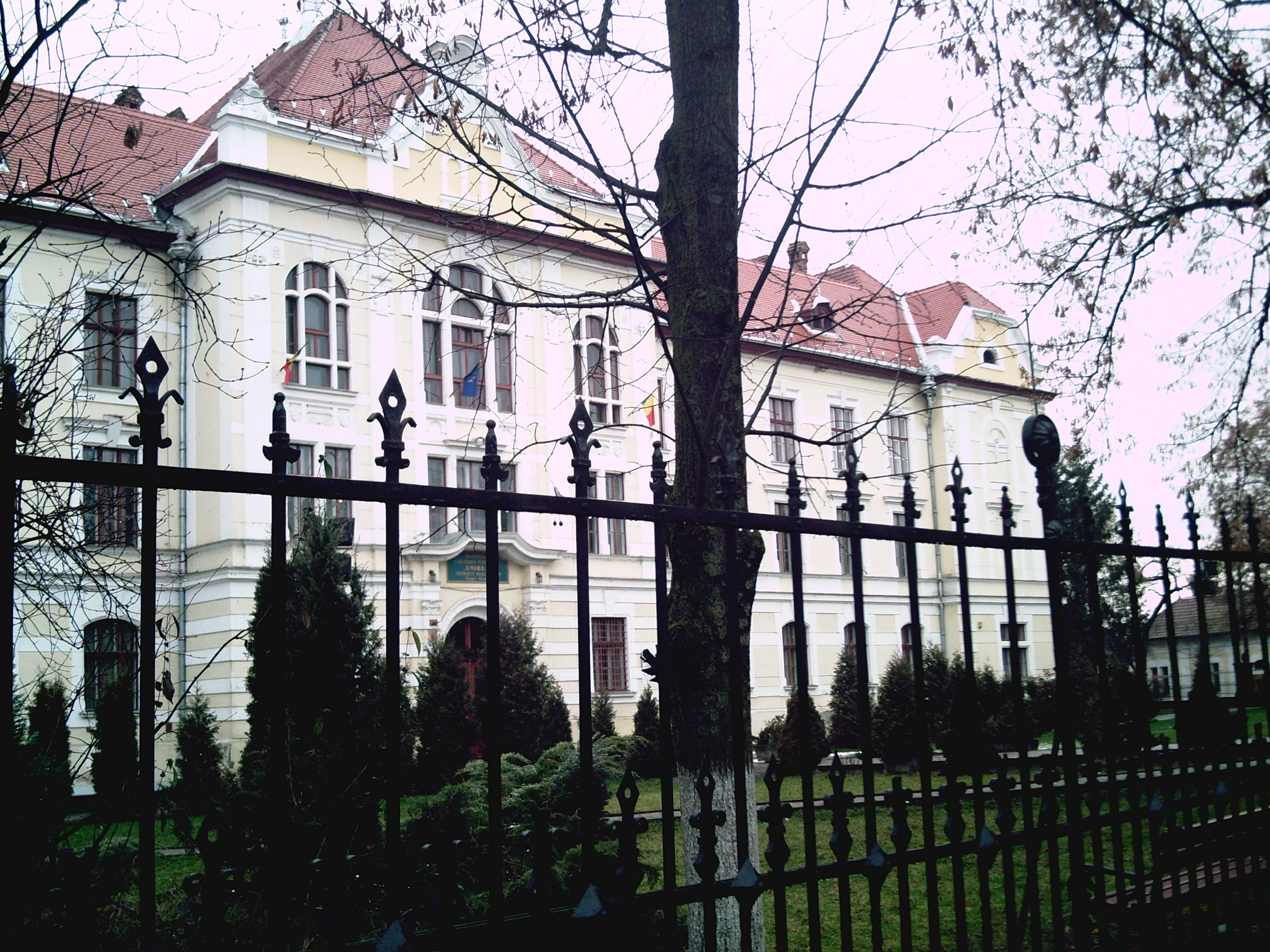
Unirea National College

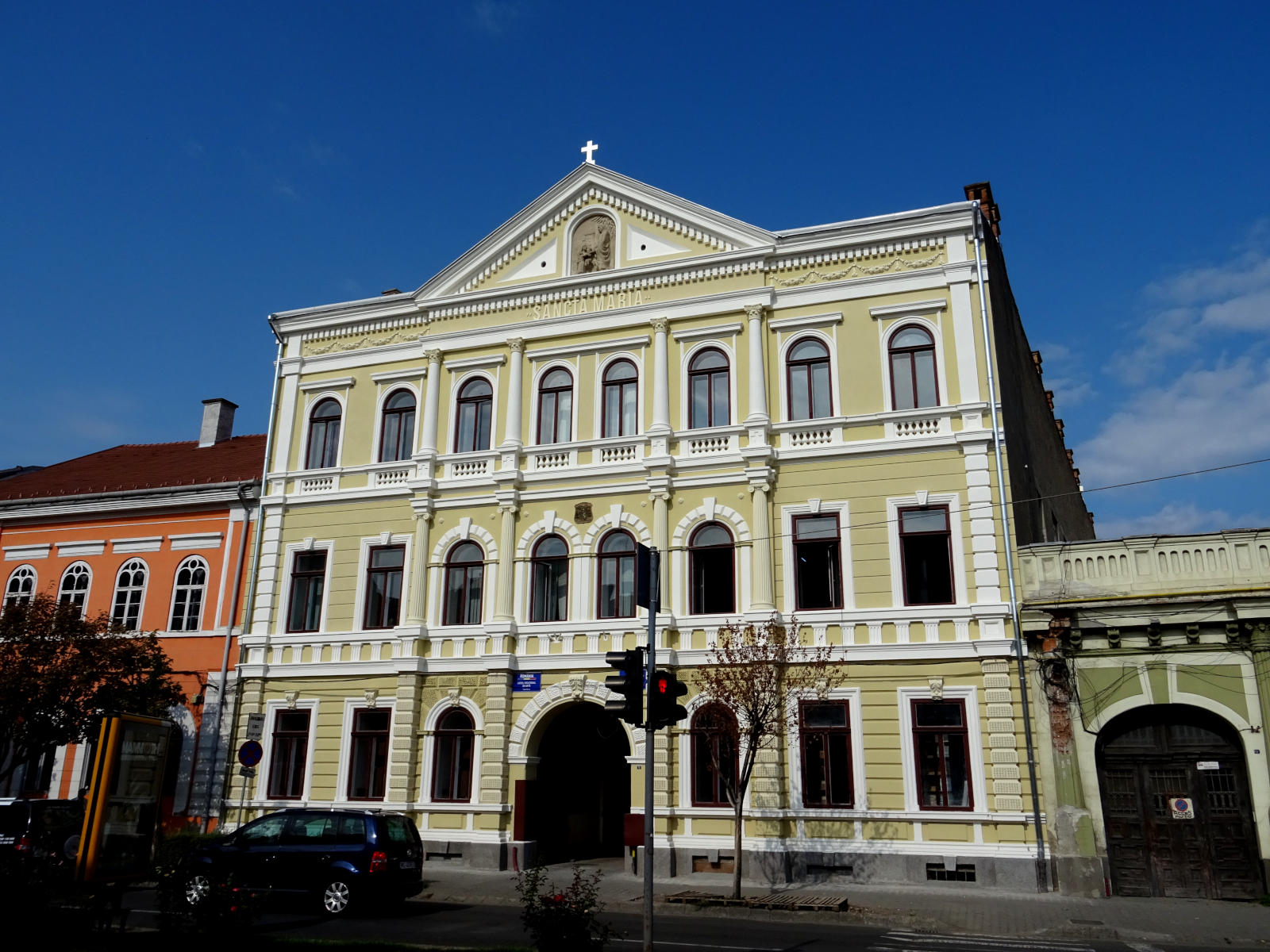
Târgu Mureș Art High School

== Health care ==
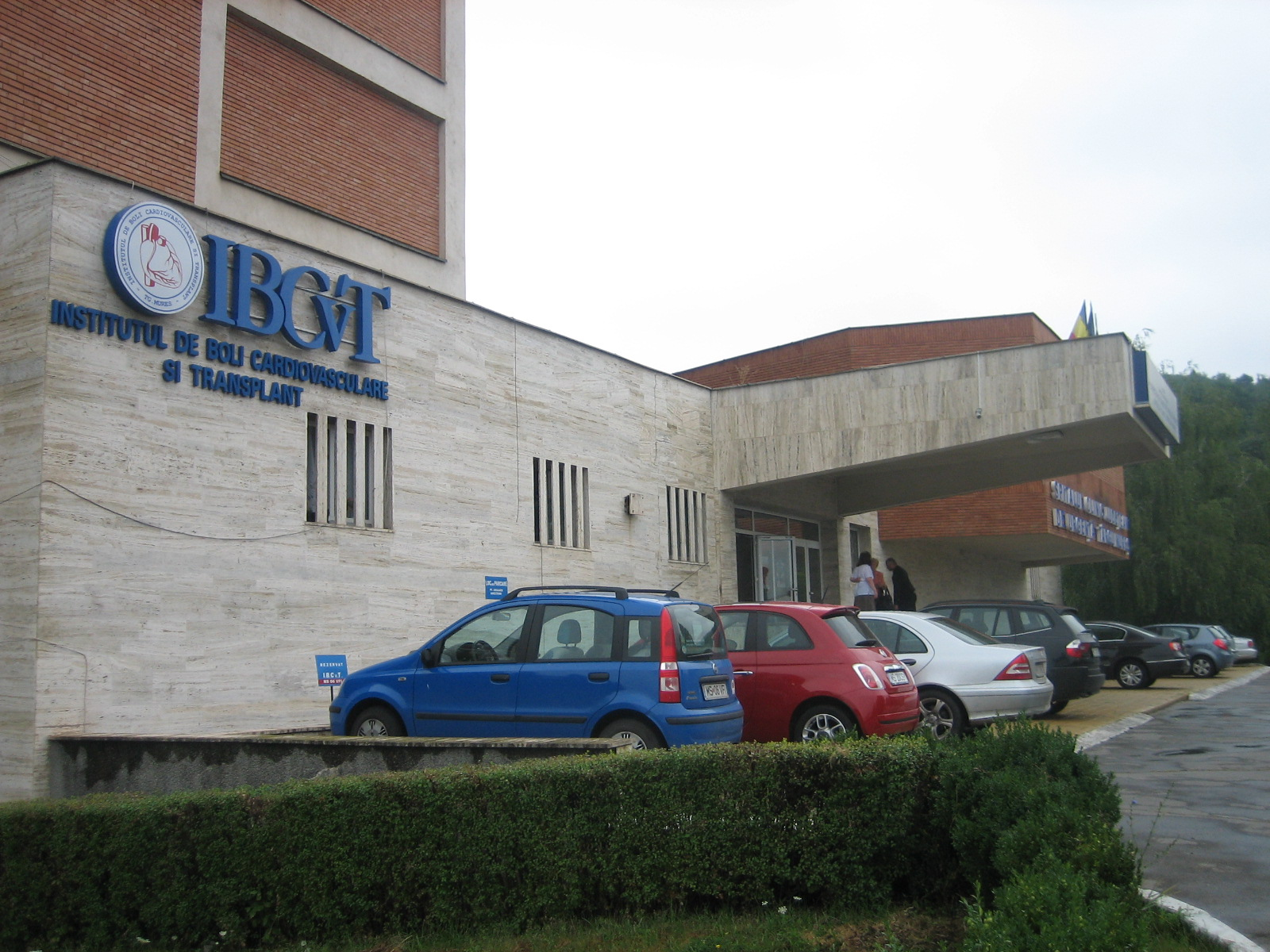
Emergency Institute for Cardiovascular Diseases and Transplant

Târgu Mureș has a well-developed healthcare system. It consists of:

- 3 hospitals
  - Târgu Mureș Emergency Clinical County Hospital (the biggest in the county) with 11 specialized units
  - Târgu Mureș Emergency Institute for Cardiovascular Diseases and Transplant
  - Mureș County Clinical Hospital with 7 specialized units
- 36 medical offices
- 9 clinics
- Over 80 pharmacies
- Ambulance service and SMURD

In medicine, units in the city are equipped with efficient equipment and highly specialized medical staff, among which stand out: the County Hospital, Emergency County Hospital (which is a regional unit), Institute of Prehospital Emergency Medical Care, Mobile Service Emergency Resuscitation and Extrication (SMURD), who at the time of its appearance was a national pilot project, and the Institute for Cardiovascular Diseases and Transplantation units under the direct authority of the Ministry of Health.

The city's medical services are exerted beyond city and county, with more than 30% of hospital patients in the Târgu Mureș Emergency County Hospital coming from other counties.

Târgu Mureș is a major academic center in medicine. The Faculties of Medicine and Pharmacy of the UMFST offers a wide range of fields, such as medical and military medicine, pharmacy, dentistry, dental technology, surgical and emergency care. It has a multicultural and multilingual status, national education law. Education is available both in Romanian and Hungarian, and also in English. Research programs are carried out both within the institution and in the hospital, there are several research projects conducted with partner institutions abroad.

== Transport ==
=== Road ===
There are several important roads that pass near the city or even through it: DN13, DN15, DN15E, and E60. The Transylvania Motorway (also known as A3), which is still under construction on some segments, passes near Târgu Mureș. Another highway that will be connected to the city is the East-West Motorway (A8) (also known as The Union Motorway), which starts in the eastern part of the country, at the Romanian border with Moldova in Ungheni, and will connect Iași to the A3 near Târgu Mureș. The contract for the design and execution of two sections of the A8 was signed in September 2023 and February 2024 respectively, while other sections of the motorway are being tendered or in various stages of planning.

=== Rail ===
Romanian main-line railways are operated mainly by Compania Națională de Căi Ferate CFR (CNCFR). There are three railway termini in Târgu Mureș, South (southbound), Central, and North (northbound), operating both domestic and international rail services. The town is one of the main stops of the routes of MÁV: Mureș InterCity, Hargita InterCity. A tourist narrow gauge line (which formed part of an extensive narrow gauge system closed in the 1990s) to Band is operated at certain times of the year.

=== Air ===
The city is served by Târgu Mureș Transilvania Airport, which provides both domestic and international flights. The airport was renovated in October 2005. It is the second busiest airport in Transylvania after the Cluj International Airport.

=== Public transport ===
Only buses are used for public transport. The city's transport operator is SC Transport Local SA. Since 2020, there have been various modifications related to transport in Târgu Mureș, including the addition of new bus lines (three of which are exclusively used for students), the modernization of the bus fleet, and the implementation of digital ticket payment. On Saturdays, Sundays, and public holidays, trips are free. Additionally, students can use public transport for free with a special bus pass.

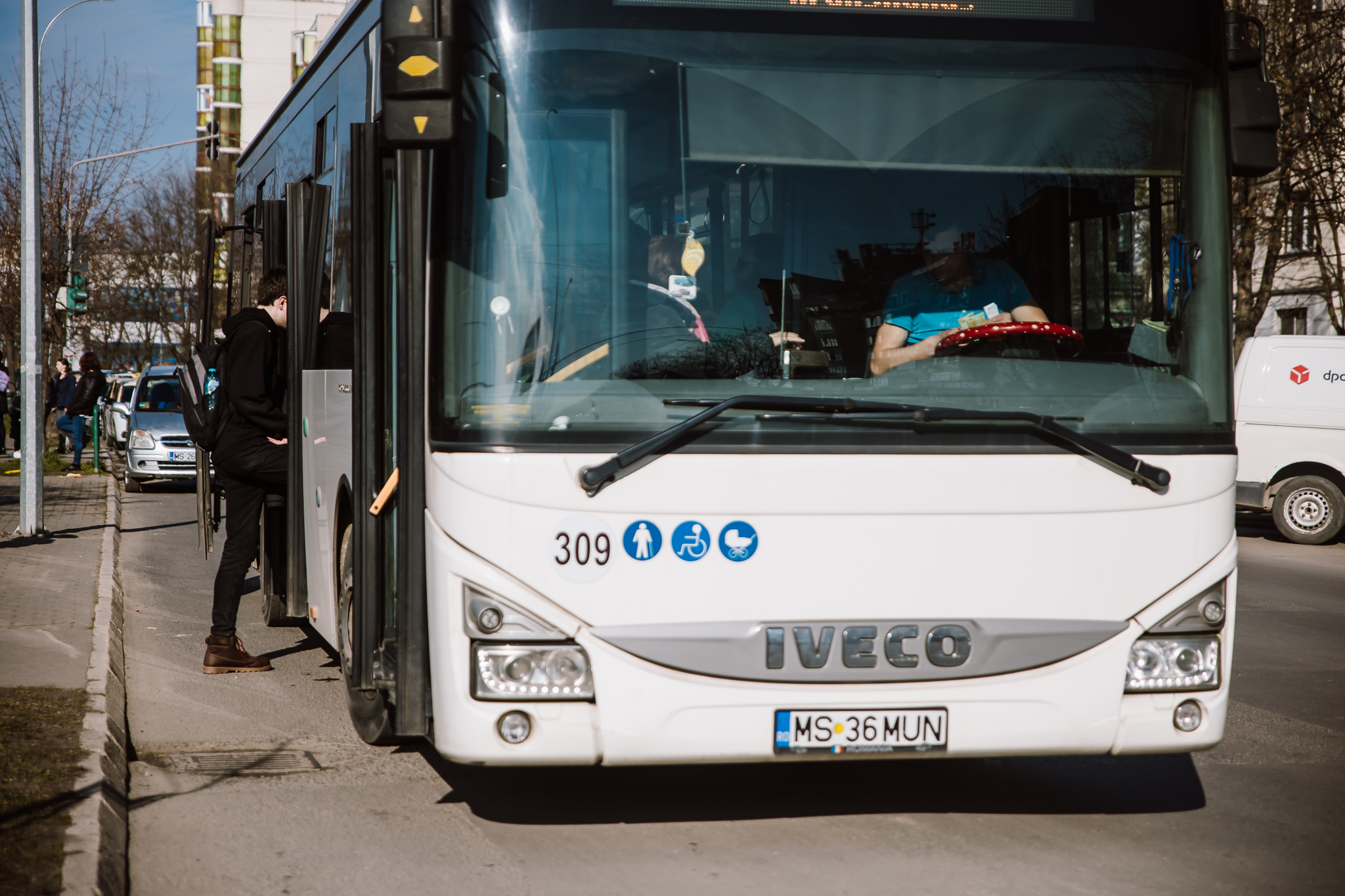
An Iveco Crossway bus.

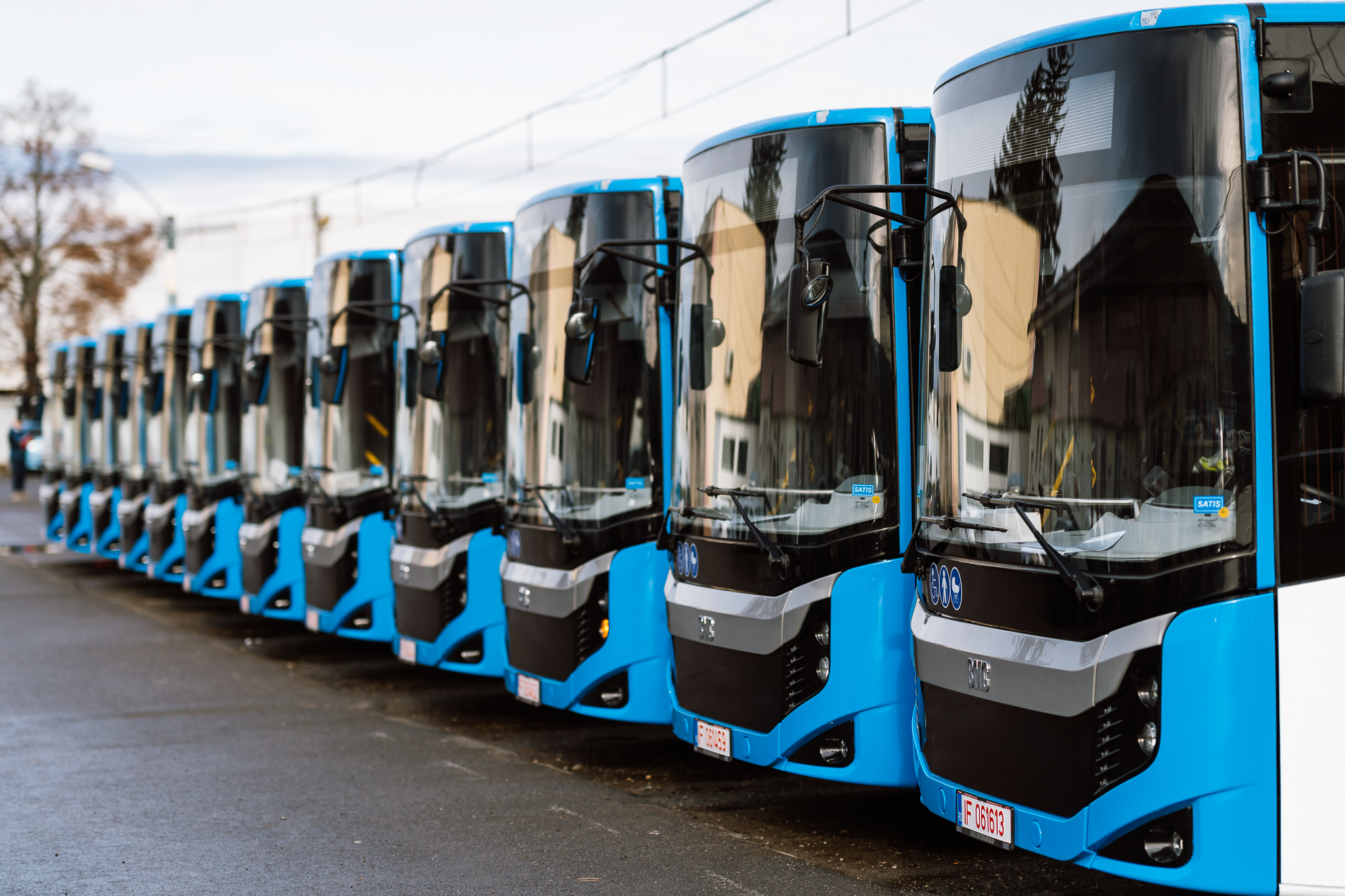
BMC Procity 12 diesel buses.

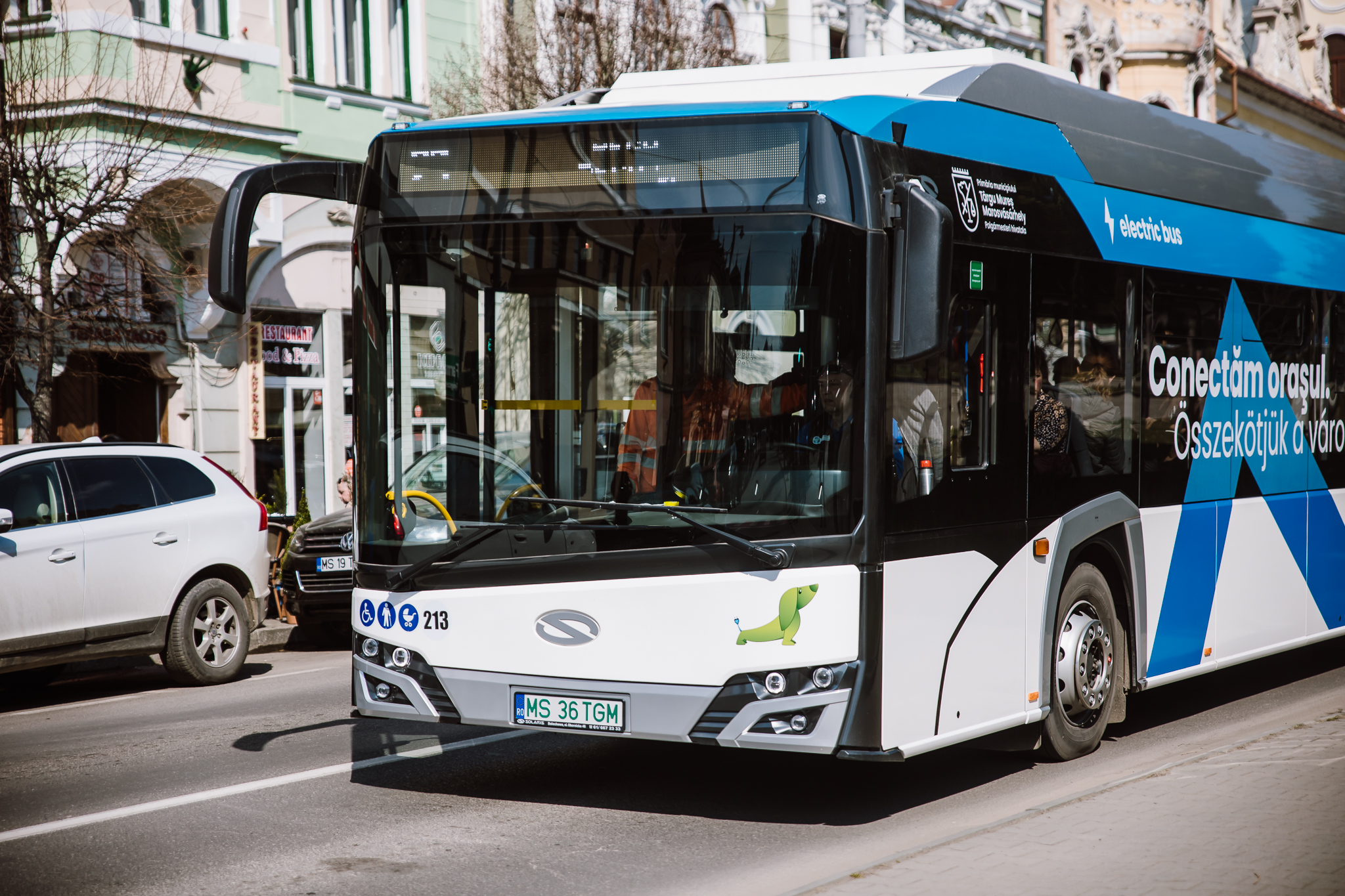
A Solaris Urbino 12 Electric.

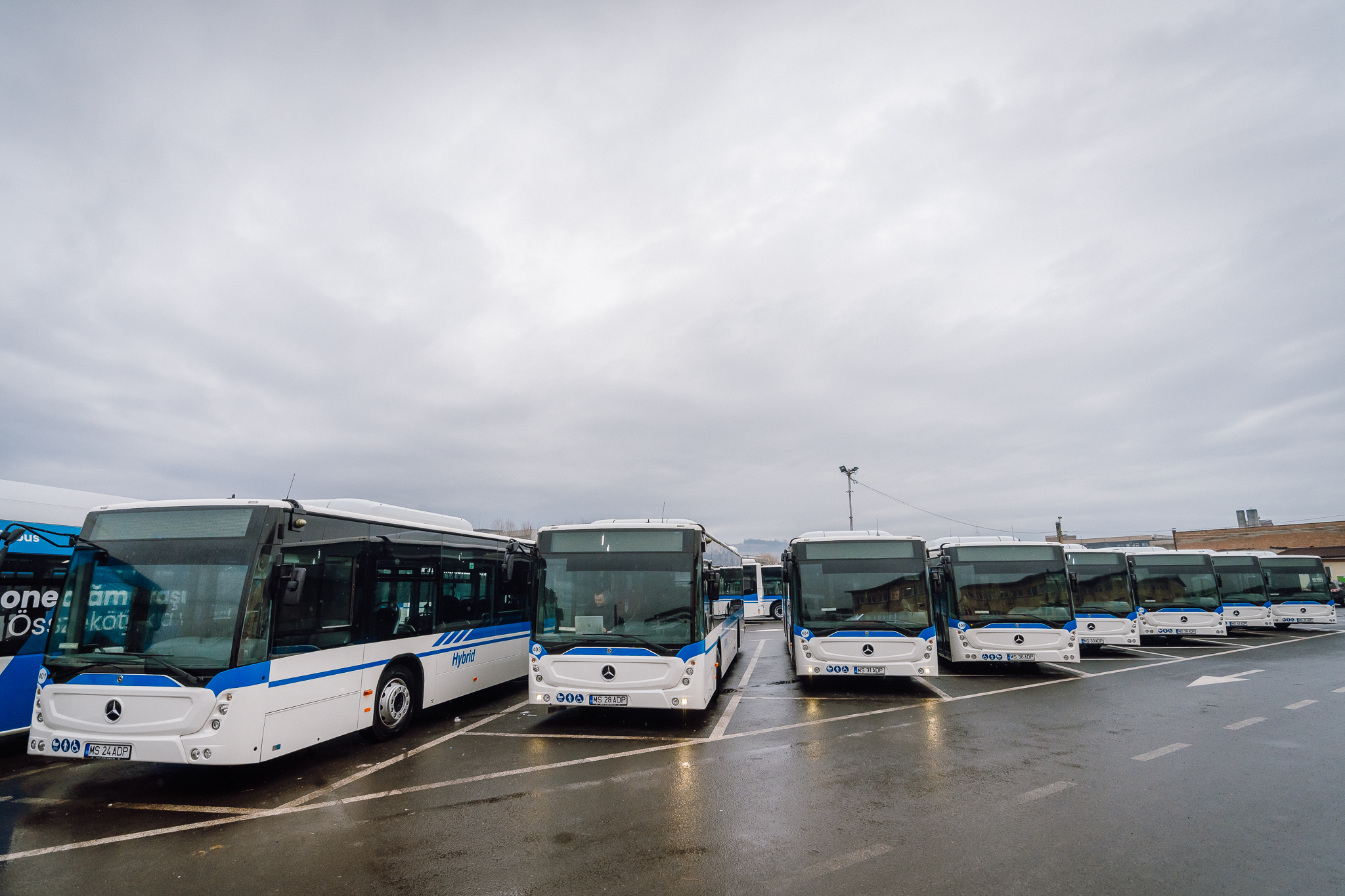
Mercedes-Benz Conecto Hybrid buses.

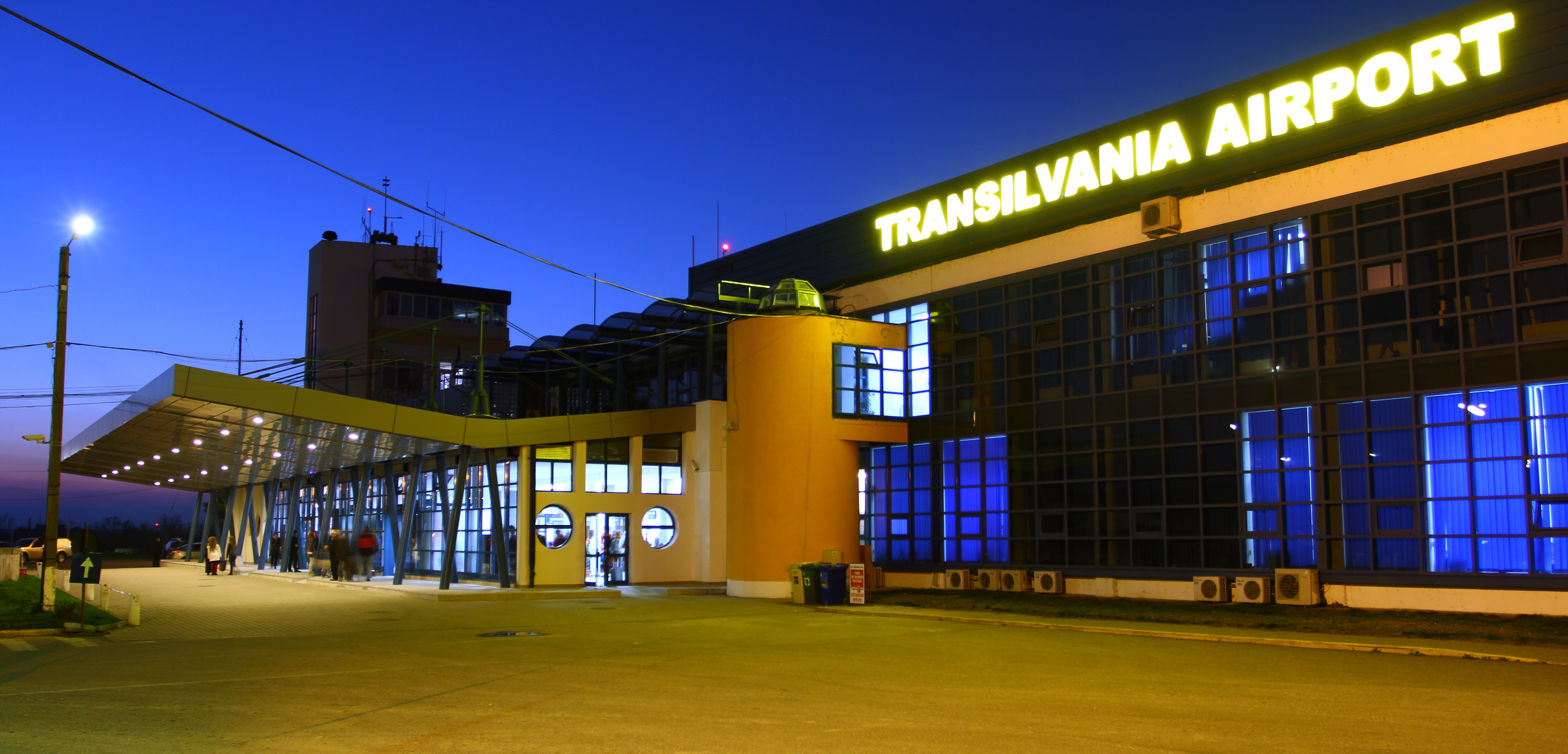
Transilvania Airport terminal

== Sports ==
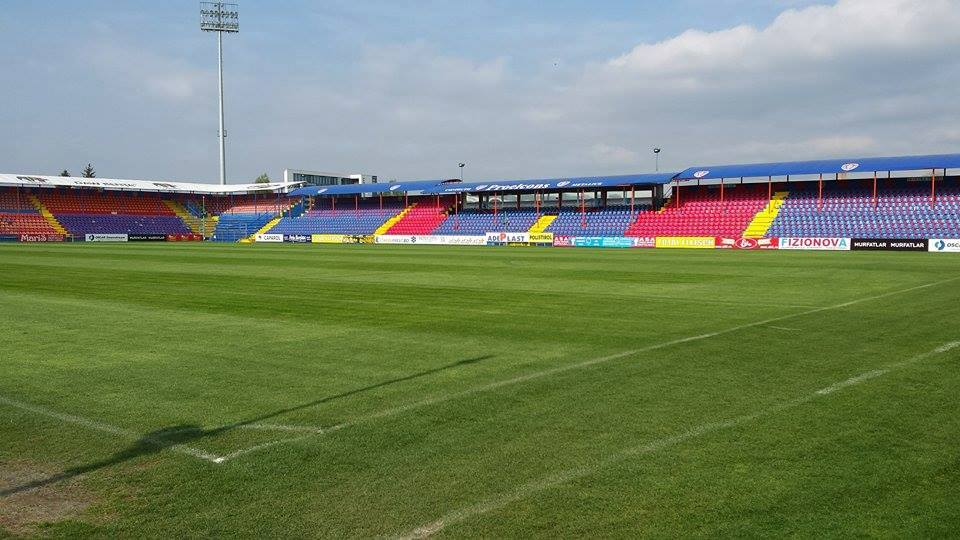
Trans-sil Stadium, home to the CSM Târgu Mureș and ACS MSE Târgu Mureș football teams

Târgu Mureș is represented in many sports, including: football, handball, basketball, futsal and volleyball.

One of the earliest clubs were Marosvásárhelyi SE, Marosvásárhelyi NMKTK, and Marosvásárhelyi Attila that played in the Hungarian league system. Currently, two football teams are based in the city: CSM Târgu Mureș and ACS MSE Târgu Mureș. Historically, the city's most successful clubs are ASA Târgu Mureș and ASA 2013 Târgu Mureș. The former was dissolved in 2007, its biggest achievement being its participation in three editions of the UEFA Cup during the '70s. The latter, founded in 2008, had a relatively short existence, being dissolved in 2017, but managed to win the 2015 Romanian Super Cup.

BC Mureș is the city's basketball team. It plays in the First Romanian League. In the 2012–13 season, the club reached its highest achievement yet. It was the first time in club history when BC Mureș won the regular season. Eventually they finished second after losing in the final 4–2 to CSU Asesoft Ploiești.

CSU Medicina represents Târgu Mureș in the women's volleyball league. The team has been a constant presence in the top flight of Romanian volleyball in the last 15 years.

Târgu Mureș is also known for its bowling team, Electromureș.

The city has the 3 times national champion futsal team City'us Târgu Mureș, team who also competed in the UEFA Futsal Champions League.

Romania's largest racetrack, Transilvania Motor Ring, is located near the city.

== Military ==
The Romanian Special Operations Forces Command is headquartered in Târgu-Mureș.

== Local media ==
Printed media

- Cuvântul liber
- Zi de zi
- 24 de ore mureșene
- Vásárhelyi Hírlap
- Népújság
- Ziarul de Mureș (weekly paper)
- Infomația de Mureș (weekly paper)
- Flash (weekly advertisement)
- Piața Mureșeană (weekly advertisement)
- Központ (weekly paper)
- Ziarul de Mureș (weekly paper)
- Infomația de Mureș (weekly paper)
- Flash (weekly advertisement)
- Piața Mureșeană (weekly advertisement)
- Mediatica.ro
- EuroMaros.ro
- kakukk.ro

Radio

- Radio Tîrgu Mureș/Marosvásárhelyi Rádió
- Rock FM
- Kiss FM
- Radio GaGa
- Radio 21
- Magic FM
- Europa FM
- Erdély FM

Television

- TTM – Televiziunea Tîrgu Mureș
- TVR Târgu Mureș
- Știi TV
- Mureș/Maros TV
- ProTV Tîrgu Mureș
- Prima TV Tîrgu Mureș
- Antena 1 Tîrgu Mureș
- Erdélyi Magyar Televízió
- Realitatea TV Tîrgu Mureș
- Duna TV Marosvásárhely

Antena 1 studios in Târgu Mureș.

== Twin towns – sister cities ==
Târgu Mureș is twinned with:

(Moldova) Chișinău; (Germany) Ilmenau; (Hungary) Baja; (Hungary) Kecskemét; (Hungary) Szeged	(Hungary) Újbuda, Budapest; (Hungary) Zalaegerszeg; (Turkey) Güzelçamlı; (United Kingdom) East Renfrewshire; (United Kingdom) Bournemouth

== See also ==
- List of Hungarian exonyms (Mureș County)

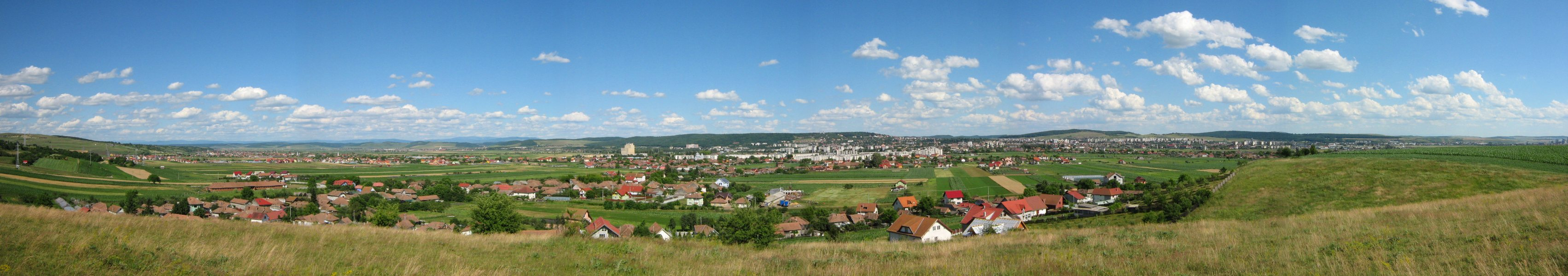
Panorama of the city (north-western part).
