= Riesz theorem =

The Riesz theorem may refer to any of several mathematical theorems due to brothers Frigyes Riesz and Marcel Riesz:

- F. and M. Riesz theorem
- F. Riesz's theorem – Characterizes finite-dimensional Hausdorff topological vector spaces (TVSs).
- Riesz representation theorem
- M. Riesz extension theorem
- Riesz–Thorin theorem
- Riesz–Fischer theorem
- Riesz's lemma
- Riesz–Markov–Kakutani representation theorem
