= Continuous linear extension =

Mathematical method in functional analysis

In functional analysis, it is often convenient to define a linear transformation on a complete, normed vector space $X$ by first defining a linear transformation $L$ on a dense subset of $X$ and then continuously extending $L$ to the whole space via the theorem below. The resulting extension remains linear and bounded, and is thus continuous, which makes it a continuous linear extension.

This procedure is known as continuous linear extension.

== Theorem ==
Every bounded linear transformation $L$ from a normed vector space $X$ to a complete, normed vector space $Y$ can be uniquely extended to a bounded linear transformation $\widehat{L}$ from the completion of $X$ to $Y.$ In addition, the operator norm of $L$ is $c$ if and only if the norm of $\widehat{L}$ is $c.$

This theorem is sometimes called the BLT theorem.

== Application ==
Consider, for instance, the definition of the Riemann integral. A step function on a closed interval $[a,b]$ is a function of the form: $f\equiv r_1 \mathbf{1}_{[a,x_1)}+r_2 \mathbf{1}_{[x_1,x_2)} + \cdots + r_n \mathbf{1}_{[x_{n-1},b]}$ where $r_1, \ldots, r_n$ are real numbers, $a = x_0 < x_1 < \ldots < x_{n-1} < x_n = b,$ and $\mathbf{1}_S$ denotes the indicator function of the set $S.$ The space of all step functions on $[a,b],$ normed by the $L^\infty$ norm (see Lp space), is a normed vector space which we denote by $\mathcal{S}.$ Define the integral of a step function by: $I \left(\sum_{i=1}^n r_i \mathbf{1}_{ [x_{i-1},x_i)}\right) = \sum_{i=1}^n r_i (x_i-x_{i-1}).$ $I$ as a function is a bounded linear transformation from $\mathcal{S}$ into $\R.$

Let $\mathcal{PC}$ denote the space of bounded, piecewise continuous functions on $[a,b]$ that are continuous from the right, along with the $L^\infty$ norm. The space $\mathcal{S}$ is dense in $\mathcal{PC},$ so we can apply the BLT theorem to extend the linear transformation $I$ to a bounded linear transformation $\widehat{I}$ from $\mathcal{PC}$ to $\R.$ This defines the Riemann integral of all functions in $\mathcal{PC}$; for every $f\in \mathcal{PC},$ $\int_a^b f(x)dx=\widehat{I}(f).$

== The Hahn–Banach theorem ==
The above theorem can be used to extend a bounded linear transformation $T : S \to Y$ to a bounded linear transformation from $\bar{S} = X$ to $Y,$ if $S$ is dense in $X.$ If $S$ is not dense in $X,$ then the Hahn–Banach theorem may sometimes be used to show that an extension exists. However, the extension may not be unique.

== See also ==
- Closed graph theorem (functional analysis) – Theorems connecting continuity to closure of graphs
- Continuous linear operator
- Densely defined operator – Function that is defined almost everywhere (mathematics)
- Hahn–Banach theorem – Theorem on extension of bounded linear functionals
- Linear extension (linear algebra) – Mathematical function, in linear algebra
- Partial function – Function whose actual domain of definition may be smaller than its apparent domain
- Vector-valued Hahn–Banach theorems
