= Otto Frostman =

Swedish mathematician (1907–1977)

Otto A. Frostman
- Born: 3 January 1907; Höör, Sweden
- Died: 29 December 1977 (aged 70); Djursholm, Sweden
- Known for: Frostman lemma
- Scientific career
- Fields: Mathematics
- Doctoral advisor: Marcel Riesz

Otto Albin Frostman (3 January 1907 – 29 December 1977) was a Swedish mathematician, known for his work in potential theory and complex analysis.

Frostman earned his Ph.D. in 1935 at Lund University under the Hungarian-born mathematician Marcel Riesz, the younger brother of Frigyes Riesz. In potential theory, Frostman's lemma is named after him. He supervised the 1971 Stockholm University Ph.D. thesis of Bernt Lindström, which initiated the "Stockholm School" of topological combinatorics (combining simplicial homology and enumerative combinatorics).
