= Johann Radon =

Austrian mathematician (1887–1956)

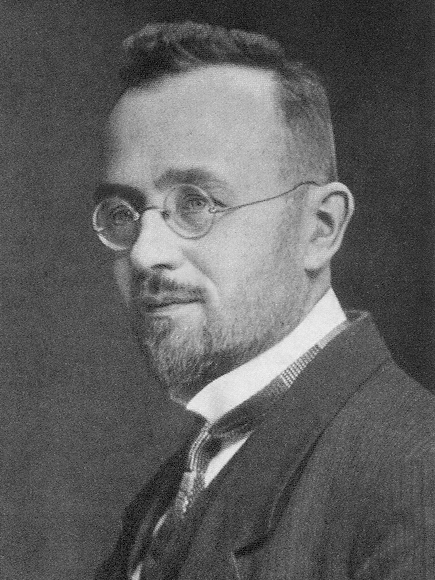
- Radon, c. 1920
- Born: Johann Karl August Radon; 16 December 1887; Děčín, Bohemia, Austria-Hungary
- Died: 25 May 1956 (aged 68); Vienna, Austria
- Resting place: Döbling Cemetery, Vienna
- Education: University of Vienna, Austria
- Known for: Radon–Hurwitz number Radon–Nikodym theorem Radon–Riesz property Radon measure Radon's theorem Radon transform
- Spouse: Maria Rigele (m. 1916)
- Scientific career
- Fields: Mathematics
- Workplaces: University of Vienna, Austria; University of Hamburg, Germany; University of Greifswald, Germany; University of Erlangen, Germany; University of Breslau, Germany (now University of Wrocław, Poland)
- Doctoral advisor: Gustav Ritter von Escherich

Johann Karl August Radon (Austrian German: [ˈraːdɔn]; 16 December 1887 – 25 May 1956) was an Austrian mathematician. His doctoral dissertation was on the calculus of variations (in 1910, at the University of Vienna).

== Life ==
Radon was born in Tetschen, Bohemia, Austria-Hungary, now Děčín, Czech Republic. He received his doctoral degree at the University of Vienna in 1910. He spent the winter semester 1910/11 at the University of Göttingen, then he was an assistant at the German Technical University in Brno, and from 1912 to 1919 at the Technical University of Vienna. In 1913/14, he passed his habilitation at the University of Vienna. Due to his near-sightedness, he was exempt from the draft during wartime.

In 1919, he was called to become Professor extraordinarius at the newly founded University of Hamburg; in 1922, he became Professor ordinarius at the University of Greifswald, and in 1925 at the University of Erlangen. Then he was Ordinarius at the University of Breslau from 1928 to 1945.

After a short stay at the University of Innsbruck he became Ordinarius at the Institute of Mathematics of the University of Vienna on 1 October 1946. In 1954/55, he was rector of the University of Vienna.

In 1939, Radon became corresponding member of the Austrian Academy of Sciences, and in 1947, he became a member. From 1952 to 1956, he was Secretary of the Class of Mathematics and Science of this Academy. From 1948 to 1950, he was president of the Austrian Mathematical Society.

Johann Radon married Maria Rigele, a secondary school teacher, in 1916. They had three sons who died young or very young. Their daughter Brigitte (1924–2020) obtained a Ph.D. in mathematics at the University of Innsbruck and married the Austrian mathematician Erich Bukovics in 1950.

Radon, as Curt C. Christian described him in 1987 at the occasion of the unveiling of his brass bust at the University of Vienna, was a friendly, good-natured man, highly esteemed by students and colleagues alike, a noble personality. He did make the impression of a quiet scholar, but he was also sociable and willing to celebrate. He loved music, and he played music with friends at home, being an excellent violinist himself, and a good singer. His love for classical literature lasted through all his life.

In 2003, the Austrian Academy of Sciences founded an Institute for Computational and Applied Mathematics and named it after Johann Radon (see the external link below).

== Achievements ==
Radon is known for a number of lasting contributions, including:

- his part in the Radon–Nikodym theorem;
- the Radon measure concept of measure as linear functional;
- the Radon transform, in integral geometry, based on integration over hyperplanes—with application to tomography for scanners (see tomographic reconstruction);
- Radon's theorem, that d + 2 points in d dimensions may always be partitioned into two subsets with intersecting convex hulls;
- the Radon–Hurwitz numbers.
- He is possibly the first to make use of the so-called Radon–Riesz property.

== See also ==
- Radon spaces
- Radonifying function
