= Vector-valued Hahn–Banach theorems =

In mathematics, specifically in functional analysis and Hilbert space theory, vector-valued Hahn–Banach theorems are generalizations of the Hahn–Banach theorems from linear functionals (which are always valued in the real numbers $\R$ or the complex numbers $\mathbb{C}$) to linear operators valued in topological vector spaces (TVSs).

== Definitions ==
Throughout X and Y will be topological vector spaces (TVSs) over the field $\mathbb{K}$ and L(X; Y) will denote the vector space of all continuous linear maps from X to Y, where if X and Y are normed spaces then we endow L(X; Y) with its canonical operator norm.

=== Extensions ===
If M is a vector subspace of a TVS X then Y has the extension property from M to X if every continuous linear map f : M → Y has a continuous linear extension to all of X. If X and Y are normed spaces, then we say that Y has the metric extension property from M to X if this continuous linear extension can be chosen to have norm equal to ‖f‖.

A TVS Y has the extension property from all subspaces of X (to X) if for every vector subspace M of X, Y has the extension property from M to X. If X and Y are normed spaces then Y has the metric extension property from all subspace of X (to X) if for every vector subspace M of X, Y has the metric extension property from M to X.

A TVS Y has the extension property if for every locally convex space X and every vector subspace M of X, Y has the extension property from M to X.

A Banach space Y has the metric extension property if for every Banach space X and every vector subspace M of X, Y has the metric extension property from M to X.

1-extensions

If M is a vector subspace of normed space X over the field $\mathbb{K}$ then a normed space Y has the immediate 1-extension property from M to X if for every x ∉ M, every continuous linear map f : M → Y has a continuous linear extension $F : M \oplus (\mathbb{K} x) \to Y$ such that ‖f‖ = ‖F‖. We say that Y has the immediate 1-extension property if Y has the immediate 1-extension property from M to X for every Banach space X and every vector subspace M of X.

=== Injective spaces ===
A locally convex topological vector space Y is injective if for every locally convex space Z containing Y as a topological vector subspace, there exists a continuous projection from Z onto Y.

A Banach space Y is 1-injective or a P_{1}-space if for every Banach space Z containing Y as a normed vector subspace (i.e. the norm of Y is identical to the usual restriction to Y of Z's norm), there exists a continuous projection from Z onto Y having norm 1.

== Properties ==
In order for a TVS Y to have the extension property, it must be complete (since it must be possible to extend the identity map $\mathbf{1} : Y \to Y$ from Y to the completion Z of Y; that is, to the map Z → Y).

=== Existence ===
If f : M → Y is a continuous linear map from a vector subspace M of X into a complete Hausdorff space Y then there always exists a unique continuous linear extension of f from M to the closure of M in X. Consequently, it suffices to only consider maps from closed vector subspaces into complete Hausdorff spaces.

== Results ==
Any locally convex space having the extension property is injective. If Y is an injective Banach space, then for every Banach space X, every continuous linear operator from a vector subspace of X into Y has a continuous linear extension to all of X.

In 1953, Alexander Grothendieck showed that any Banach space with the extension property is either finite-dimensional or else not separable.

Theorem—Suppose that Y is a Banach space over the field $\mathbb{K}.$ Then the following are equivalent:

1. Y is 1-injective;
2. Y has the metric extension property;
3. Y has the immediate 1-extension property;
4. Y has the center-radius property;
5. Y has the weak intersection property;
6. Y is 1-complemented in any Banach space into which it is norm embedded;
7. Whenever Y in norm-embedded into a Banach space $X$ then identity map $\mathbf{1} : Y \to Y$ can be extended to a continuous linear map of norm $1$ to $X$;
8. Y is linearly isometric to $C\left(T, \mathbb{K}, \|\dot{}\|_{\infty}\right)$ for some compact, Hausdorff space, extremally disconnected space T. (This space T is unique up to homeomorphism).

where if in addition, Y is a vector space over the real numbers then we may add to this list:

9. Y has the binary intersection property;
10. Y is linearly isometric to a complete Archimedean ordered vector lattice with order unit and endowed with the order unit norm.

Theorem—Suppose that Y is a real Banach space with the metric extension property. Then the following are equivalent:

1. Y is reflexive;
2. Y is separable;
3. Y is finite-dimensional;
4. Y is linearly isometric to $C\left(T, \mathbb{K}, \|\cdot\|_{\infty}\right),$ for some discrete finite space $T.$

== Examples ==
Products of the underlying field

Suppose that $X$ is a vector space over $\mathbb{K}$, where $\mathbb{K}$ is either $\R$ or $\Complex$ and let $T$ be any set. Let $Y := \mathbb{K}^T,$ which is the product of $\mathbb{K}$ taken $|T|$ times, or equivalently, the set of all $\mathbb{K}$-valued functions on T. Give $Y$ its usual product topology, which makes it into a Hausdorff locally convex TVS. Then $Y$ has the extension property.

For any set $T,$ the Lp space $\ell^{\infty}(T)$ has both the extension property and the metric extension property.

== See also ==
- Continuous linear extension – Mathematical method in functional analysis
- Continuous linear operator
- Hahn–Banach theorem – Theorem on extension of bounded linear functionals
- Hyperplane separation theorem – On the existence of hyperplanes separating disjoint convex sets
