= Frostman lemma =

Tool for estimating the Hausdorff dimension of sets

In mathematics, Frostman's lemma provides a convenient tool for estimating the Hausdorff dimension of sets; specifically, the dimension of fractals. It is named after Otto Frostman.

== Statement ==
Let $A$ be a Borel subset of $\R^n$, and let $s>0$. Then the following are equivalent:

- $H^s(A)>0$, where $H^s$ denotes the $s$-dimensional Hausdorff measure;
- There is an (unsigned) Borel measure $\mu$ on $\R^n$ satisfying $\mu(A)>0$ such that $\mu(B(x,r))\leq r^s$ for all $x\in \R^n$ and $r>0$.

Otto Frostman first proved this lemma for closed sets as part of his dissertation at Lund University in 1935. The generalization to Borel sets is more involved, and requires the theory of Suslin sets.

A useful corollary of Frostman's lemma requires the notions of the $s$-capacity of a Borel set $A\subseteq \R^n$, which is defined by

$$C_s(A):=\sup\Bigl\{\Bigl(\int_{A\times A} \frac{d\mu(x)\,d\mu(y)}{|x-y|^{s}}\Bigr)^{-1}:\mu\text{ is a Borel measure and }\mu(A)=1\Bigr\}.$$

Here, we take $\operatorname{inf}\varnothing = \infty$ and $1/\infty = 0$. As before, the measure $\mu$ is unsigned. It follows from Frostman's lemma that for Borel $A\subseteq \R^n$,

$$\mathrm{dim}_H(A)= \sup\{s\geq 0:C_s(A)>0\}.$$

- Mattila, Pertti (1995). Geometry of Sets and Measures in Euclidean Spaces. Cambridge Studies in Advanced Mathematics. Vol. 44. Cambridge University Press. ISBN 978-0-521-65595-8. MR 1333890.
