= Gustav Herglotz =

German mathematician

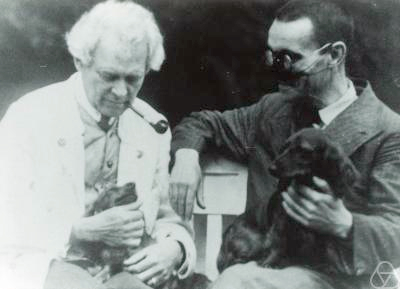
- Gustav Herglotz (left), with Gaston Julia and two dogs
- Born: 2 February 1881; Wallern, Bohemia, Austria-Hungary
- Died: 22 March 1953 (aged 72); Göttingen, Germany
- Education: University of Göttingen; Ludwig-Maximilians-Universität München
- Known for: Herglotz formulas Herglotz–Noether theorem Herglotz-Riesz representation theorem Herglotz–Zagier function Wiechert–Herglotz method
- Awards: Lieben Prize (1915)
- Scientific career
- Fields: Physics, Applied mathematics
- Workplaces: Leipzig University
- Doctoral advisor: Hugo von Seeliger; Ludwig Boltzmann
- Doctoral students: Emil Artin

Gustav Herglotz (2 February 1881 – 22 March 1953) was a German Bohemian physicist best known for his works on the theory of relativity and seismology.

== Biography ==
Gustav Ferdinand Joseph Wenzel Herglotz was born in Volary num. 28 to a public notary Gustav Herglotz (also a Doctor of Law) and his wife Maria née Wachtel. The family were Sudeten Germans. He studied mathematics and astronomy at the University of Vienna in 1899, and attended lectures by Ludwig Boltzmann. In this time of study, he had a friendship with his colleagues Paul Ehrenfest, Hans Hahn and Heinrich Tietze. In 1900, he went to the Ludwig-Maximilians-Universität München and achieved his Doctorate in 1902 under Hugo von Seeliger. Afterwards, he went to the University of Göttingen, where he habilitated under Felix Klein. In 1904, he became Privatdozent for Astronomy and Mathematics there, and in 1907 Professor extraordinarius. In 1908, he became Professor extraordinarius at the University of Vienna, and in 1909 at Leipzig University. From 1925 (until becoming Emeritus in 1947), he again was at the University of Göttingen as the successor of Carl Runge on the chair of applied mathematics. One of his students was Emil Artin.

== Work ==
Herglotz worked in the fields of seismology, number theory, celestial mechanics, theory of electrons, special relativity, general relativity, hydrodynamics, refraction theory.

- In 1904, Herglotz defined relations for the electrodynamic potential which are also valid in special relativity even before that theory was fully developed. Hermann Minkowski (during a conversation reported by Arnold Sommerfeld) pointed out that the four-dimensional symmetry of electrodynamics is latently contained and mathematically applied in Herglotz' paper.
- In 1907, he became interested in the theory of earthquakes, and together with Emil Wiechert, he developed the Wiechert–Herglotz method for the determination of the velocity distribution of Earth's interior from the known propagation times of seismic waves (an inverse problem). There, Herglotz solved a special integral equation of Abelian type.
- The Herglotz–Noether theorem stated by Herglotz (1909) and independently by Fritz Noether (1909), was used by Herglotz to classify all possible forms of rotational motions satisfying Born rigidity. In the course of this work, Herglotz showed that the Lorentz transformations correspond to hyperbolic motions in $R_3$, by which he classified the one-parameter Lorentz transformations into loxodromic, parabolic, elliptic, and hyperbolic groups (see Möbius transformation#Lorentz transformation).
- In 1911, he formulated the Herglotz representation theorem which concerns holomorphic functions f on the unit disk D, with Re f ≥ 0 and f(0) = 1, represented as an integral over the boundary of D with respect to a probability measure μ. The theorem asserts that such a function exists if and only if there is a μ such that

$$\forall z \in D \ \ f (z) \ = \ \int_{\partial D} \frac{\lambda + z}{\lambda - z}\ d\mu(\lambda).$$

The theorem also asserts that the probability measure is unique to f.

- In 1911, he formulated a relativistic theory of elasticity. In the course of that work, he obtained the vector Lorentz transformation for arbitrary velocities (see History of Lorentz transformations#Herglotz (1911)).
- In 1916, he also contributed to general relativity. Independently of previous work by Hendrik Lorentz (1916), he showed as to how the contracted Riemann tensor and the curvature invariant can be geometrically interpreted.

== Selected works ==
- Gesammelte Schriften / Gustav Herglotz, edited for d. Akad. d. Wiss. in Göttingen by Hans Schwerdtfeger. XL, 652 p., Vandenhoeck & Ruprecht, Göttingen 1979, ISBN 3-525-40720-3.
- Vorlesungen über die Mechanik der Kontinua / G. Herglotz, prepared by R. B. Guenther and H. Schwerdtfeger, Teubner-Archiv zur Mathematik; vol. 3, 251 p.: 1 Ill., graph. Darst.; 22 cm, Teubner, Leipzig 1985.
- Über die analytische Fortsetzung des Potentials ins Innere der anziehenden Massen, Preisschriften der Fürstlichen Jablonowskischen Gesellschaft zu Leipzig, VII, 52 pages, with 18 Fig.; Teubner, Leipzig (1914).
- Über das quadratische Reziprozitätsgesetz in imaginären quadratischen Zahlkörpern, Ber. über d. Verh. d. königl. sächs. Gesellsch. d. Wissensch. zu Leipzig, pp. 303–310 (1921).

== See also ==
- Acceleration (special relativity)
- Möbius transformation
- Spherical wave transformation
- Squeeze mapping
- Rindler coordinates
- Herglotz's variational principle
