= Ernst Sigismund Fischer =

Austrian mathematician (1875–1954)

Ernst S. Fischer
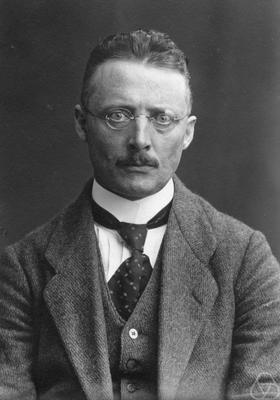
- ca. 1920
- Born: 12 July 1875; Vienna
- Died: 14 November 1954 (aged 79); Cologne
- Education: University of Vienna
- Known for: Riesz–Fischer theorem Fischer's inequality
- Spouse: Ellis Strauss
- Children: Ursula
- Scientific career
- Fields: Mathematics
- Workplaces: University of Cologne
- Thesis: Zur Theorie der Determinanten (1899)
- Doctoral advisor: Franz Mertens; Leopold Gegenbauer

Ernst Sigismund Fischer (12 July 1875 – 14 November 1954) was a mathematician born in Vienna, Austria. He worked alongside Franz Mertens and Hermann Minkowski at the universities of Vienna and Zurich, respectively. He later became professor at the University of Erlangen, where he worked with Emmy Noether.

His main area of research was mathematical analysis, specifically orthonormal sequences of functions, which laid groundwork for the emergence of the concept of a Hilbert space.

The Riesz–Fischer theorem in Lebesgue integration is named in his honour.

He is the grandson of composer Karl Graedener.
