= Riesz function =

Mathematical function

Riesz(x) for x from 0 to 50

In mathematics, the Riesz function is an entire function defined by Marcel Riesz in connection with the Riemann hypothesis, by means of the power series

$${\rm Riesz}(x) = \sum_{k=1}^\infty \frac{(-1)^{k-1}x^k}{(k-1)! \zeta(2k)}=x \sum_{n=1}^\infty \frac{\mu(n)}{n^2} \exp\left(\frac{-x}{n^2}\right).$$

If we set $F(x) = \frac12 {\rm Riesz}(4 \pi^2 x)$ we may define it in terms of the coefficients of the Laurent series development of the hyperbolic (or equivalently, the ordinary) cotangent around zero. If

$$\frac{x}{2} \coth \frac{x}{2} = \sum_{n=0}^\infty c_n x^n = 1 + \frac{1}{12} x^2 - \frac{1}{720}x^4 + \cdots$$

then $F$ may be defined as

$$F(x) = \sum_{k=1}^\infty \frac{x^k}{c_{2k}(k-1)!} = 12x - 720x^2 + 15120x^3 - \cdots$$

The values of $\zeta(2k)$ approach one for increasing k, and comparing the series for the Riesz function with that for $x\exp(-x)$ shows that it defines an entire function. Alternatively, F may be defined as

$$F(x) = \sum_{k=1}^{\infty}\frac{k^{\overline{k+1}}x^{k}}{B_{2k}}. \$$

$n^{\overline{k}}$ denotes the rising factorial power in the notation of D. E. Knuth and the number $B_n$ are the Bernoulli number. The series is one of alternating terms and the function quickly tends to minus infinity for increasingly negative values of $x$. Positive values of $x$ are more interesting and delicate.

Riesz function satisfies the integral equation $1-\exp(-x)= \int_{0}^{\infty}\frac {\lfloor\sqrt{x/t}\rfloor}{t} \text{Riesz}(t)\, dt$

== Riesz criterion ==
It can be shown that

$$\operatorname{Riesz}(x) = O(x^e)\qquad (\text{as }x\to\infty)$$

for any exponent $e$ larger than $1/2$, where this is big O notation; taking values both positive and negative. Riesz showed that the Riemann hypothesis is equivalent to the claim that the above is true for any e larger than $1/4$. In the same paper, he added a slightly pessimistic note too: «Je ne sais pas encore decider si cette condition facilitera la vérification de l'hypothèse» ("I can't decide if this condition will facilitate the verification of the hypothesis yet").

== Mellin transform of the Riesz function ==
The Riesz function is related to the Riemann zeta function via its Mellin transform. If we take

$${\mathcal M}({\rm Riesz}(z)) = \int_0^\infty {\rm Riesz}(z) z^s \frac{dz}{z}$$

we see that if $\Re(s)>-1$ then

$$\int_0^1 {\rm Riesz}(z) z^s \frac{dz}{z}$$

converges, whereas from the growth condition we have that if $\Re(s) < -\frac{1}{2}$ then

$$\int_1^\infty {\rm Riesz}(z) z^s \frac{dz}{z}$$

converges. Putting this together, we see the Mellin transform of the Riesz function is defined on the strip $-1 < \Re(s) < -\frac12$. On this strip, we have (cf. Ramanujan's master theorem) $\frac{\Gamma(s+1)}{\zeta(-2s)} = {\mathcal M}({\rm Riesz}(z))$

From the inverse Mellin transform, we now get an expression for the Riesz function, as

$${\rm Riesz}(z) = \frac{1}{2\pi i}\int_{c - i \infty}^{c+i \infty} \frac{\Gamma(s+1)}{\zeta(-2s)} z^{-s} ds$$

where c is between minus one and minus one-half. If the Riemann hypothesis is true, we can move the line of integration to any value less than minus one-fourth, and hence we get the equivalence between the fourth-root rate of growth for the Riesz function and the Riemann hypothesis.

== Calculation of the Riesz function ==
The Maclaurin series coefficients of $F$ increase in absolute value until they reach their maximum at the 40th term of $-1.753\times 10^{17}$. By the 109th term they have dropped below one in absolute value. Taking the first 1000 terms suffices to give a very accurate value for $F(z)$ for $|z| < 9$. However, this would require evaluating a polynomial of degree 1000 either using rational arithmetic with the coefficients of large numerator or denominator, or using floating point computations of over 100 digits. An alternative is to use the inverse Mellin transform defined above and numerically integrate. Neither approach is computationally easy.

Another approach is to use acceleration of convergence. We have

$${\rm Riesz}(x) = \sum_{k=1}^\infty \frac{(-1)^{k+1}x^k}{(k-1)! \zeta(2k)}.$$

Since $\zeta(2k)$ approaches one as k grows larger, the terms of this series approach

$\sum_{k=1}^\infty \frac{(-1)^{k+1}x^k}{(k-1)!} = x \exp(-x)$. Indeed, Riesz noted that: $\ {\sum_{n=1}^\infty {\rm Riesz}(x/n^2) = x \exp(-x)}.$

Using Kummer's method for accelerating convergence gives

$${\rm Riesz}(x) = x \exp(-x) - \sum_{k=1}^\infty \left(\zeta(2k) -1\right) \left(\frac{(-1)^{k+1}}
{(k-1)! \zeta(2k)}\right)x^k$$

with an improved rate of convergence.

Continuing this process leads to a new series for the Riesz function with much better convergence properties:

$${\rm Riesz}(x) = \sum_{k=1}^\infty \frac{(-1)^{k+1}x^k}{(k-1)! \zeta(2k)}
= \sum_{k=1}^\infty \frac{(-1)^{k+1}x^k}{(k-1)!} \left(\sum_{n=1}^\infty \mu(n)n^{-2k}\right)$$
$$\sum_{k=1}^\infty \sum_{n=1}^\infty \frac{(-1)^{k+1}\left(x/n^2\right)^k}{(k-1)!}= x \sum_{n=1}^\infty \frac{\mu(n)}{n^2} \exp\left(-\frac{x}{n^2}\right).$$

Here $\mu$ is the Möbius function, and the rearrangement of terms is justified by absolute convergence. We may now apply Kummer's method again, and write

$${\rm Riesz}(x) = x \left(\frac{6}{\pi^2} + \sum_{n=1}^\infty \frac{\mu(n)}{n^2}\left(\exp\left(-\frac{x}{n^2}\right) - 1\right)\right)$$

the terms of which eventually decrease as the inverse fourth power of $n$.

The above series are absolutely convergent everywhere, and hence may be differentiated term by term, leading to the following expression for the derivative of the Riesz function:

$${\rm Riesz}'(x) = \frac{\text{Riesz}(x)}{x} - x\left(\sum_{n=1}^\infty \frac{\mu(n)}{n^4} \exp\left(-\frac{x}{n^2}\right)\right)$$

which may be rearranged as

$${\rm Riesz}'(x) = \frac{\text{Riesz}(x)}{x} + x\left(-\frac{90}{\pi^4} + \sum_{n=1}^\infty \frac{\mu(n)}{n^4} \left(1-\exp\left(-\frac{x}{n^2}\right)\right)\right).$$

Marek Wolf in assuming the Riemann Hypothesis has shown that for large $x$:

$${\rm Riesz}(x) \sim K x^{1/4} \sin\left(\phi-\frac{1}{2}\gamma_1\log(x)\right)$$

where $\gamma_1=14.13472514...$ is the imaginary part of the first nontrivial zero of the zeta function, $K = 7.7750627...\times 10^{-5}$ and $\phi=-0.54916...= -31,46447^{\circ}$. It agrees with the general theorems about zeros of the Riesz function proved in 1964 by Herbert Wilf.

A plot for the range 0 to 50 is given above. So far as it goes, it does not indicate very rapid growth and perhaps bodes well for the truth of the Riemann hypothesis.

== Hardy–Littlewood criterion ==
G. H. Hardy and J. E. Littlewood proved, by similar methods, that the Riemann hypothesis is equivalent to the claim that the following will be true for any exponent $e$ larger than $-1/4$:

$$\sum_{k=1}^\infty \frac{(-x)^k}{k! \zeta(2k+1)} = O(x^{e})\qquad (\text{as }x\to\infty).$$
