= Hermann Graedener =

German-Austrian composer, conductor and teacher (1844–1929)

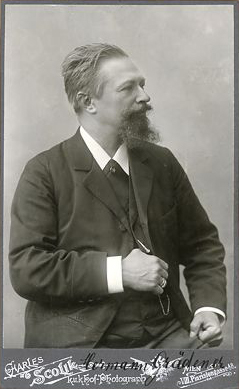
Hermann Graedener

Hermann Graedener or Grädener (8 May 1844 – 15 September 1929) was a German-Austrian composer, conductor and teacher.

== Biography ==
He was born in Kiel in the Duchy of Holstein. He was educated by his father, composer Karl Graedener. He then studied at the Vienna Conservatory. From 1862 he was organist at the Lutheran City Church in Vienna, and from 1864 violinist in the court's orchestra. He taught at the Vienna Conservatory from 1877 to 1913, being a professor from 1882. Between 1892 and 1896 he was director of the Wiener Singakademie. He died in Vienna.

His compositions, influenced by Johannes Brahms, include two symphonies, two violin concertos, two cello concertos, two string quartets, two piano quintets and two piano trios. (Grove also mentions a piano concerto, but this may be confused with that written by his father.)

He was the father of the writer Hermann Graedener.
