= Karl Graedener =

German composer (1812–1883)

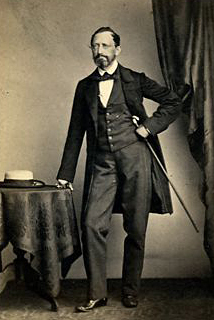

Karl Graedener (14 January 1812 – 10 June 1883) was a German composer.

== Biography ==
He was born in Rostock. From 1835 to 1838 he was a cellist in Helsinki. Then, he was musical director of the Kiel University for ten years. In 1851 he founded a singing school in Hamburg, which he directed until 1861. From 1862 to 1865 he taught singing and music theory at the Vienna Conservatory and then at the Hamburg Conservatory until his death.

== Works ==
His compositions included three operas, two symphonies, a piano concerto, chamber music and Lieder.

His son Hermann Graedener was also a composer.

His grandson Ernst Sigismund Fischer was a well-known mathematician.
