= Positive harmonic function =

In mathematics, a positive harmonic function on the unit disc in the complex numbers is characterized as the Poisson integral of a finite positive measure on the circle. This result, the Herglotz-Riesz representation theorem, was proved independently by Gustav Herglotz and Frigyes Riesz in 1911. It can be used to give a related formula and characterization for any holomorphic function on the unit disc with positive real part. Such functions had already been characterized in 1907 by Constantin Carathéodory in terms of the positive definiteness of their Taylor coefficients.

== Herglotz-Riesz representation theorem for harmonic functions ==
A positive function f on the unit disk with f(0) = 1 is harmonic if and only if there is a probability measure μ on the unit circle such that

$$f(re^{i\theta})=\int_0^{2\pi}  {1-r^2\over 1-2r\cos (\theta-\varphi) + r^2} \, d\mu(\varphi).$$

The formula clearly defines a positive harmonic function with f(0) = 1.

Conversely if f is positive and harmonic and r_{n} increases to 1, define

$$f_n(z)=f(r_nz). \,$$

Then

$$f_n(re^{i\theta}) = {1\over 2\pi}\int_0^{2\pi} {1-r^2\over 1-2r\cos(\theta-\varphi) + r^2 }\, f_n(\varphi)\,d\varphi =\int_0^{2\pi}{1-r^2\over 1-2r\cos(\theta-\varphi) + r^2 } d\mu_n(\varphi)$$

where

$$d\mu_n(\varphi)={1\over 2\pi} f(r_n e^{i\varphi})\,d\varphi$$

is a probability measure.

By a compactness argument (or equivalently in this case Helly's selection theorem for Stieltjes integrals), a subsequence of these probability measures has a weak limit which is also a probability measure μ.

Since r_{n} increases to 1, so that f_{n}(z) tends to f(z), the Herglotz formula follows.

== Herglotz-Riesz representation theorem for holomorphic functions ==
A holomorphic function f on the unit disk with f(0) = 1 has positive real part if and only if there is a probability measure μ on the unit circle such that

$$f(z) =\int_0^{2\pi} {1 + e^{-i\theta}z\over 1 -e^{-i\theta}z} \,  d\mu(\theta).$$

This follows from the previous theorem because:

- the Poisson kernel is the real part of the integrand above
- the real part of a holomorphic function is harmonic and determines the holomorphic function up to addition of a scalar
- the above formula defines a holomorphic function, the real part of which is given by the previous theorem

== Carathéodory's positivity criterion for holomorphic functions ==
Let

$$f(z)=1 + a_1 z + a_2 z^2 + \cdots$$

be a holomorphic function on the unit disk. Then f(z) has positive real part on the disk if and only if

$$\sum_m\sum_n a_{m-n} \lambda_m\overline{\lambda_n} \ge 0$$

for any complex numbers λ_{0}, λ_{1}, ..., λ_{N}, where

$$a_0=2,\,\,\, a_{-m} =\overline{a_m}$$

for m > 0.

In fact from the Herglotz representation for n > 0

$$a_n =2\int_0^{2\pi} e^{-in\theta}\, d\mu(\theta).$$

Hence

$$\sum_m\sum_n a_{m-n} \lambda_m\overline{\lambda_n} =\int_0^{2\pi} \left|\sum_{n} \lambda_n e^{-in\theta}\right|^2 \, d\mu(\theta) \ge 0.$$

Conversely, setting λ_{n} = z^{n},

$$\sum_{m=0}^\infty\sum_{n=0}^\infty a_{m-n} \lambda_m\overline{\lambda_n} = 2(1-|z|^2) \,\Re\, f(z).$$

== See also ==
- Bochner's theorem
