= Herglotz's variational principle =

Principle in mathematical physics

In mathematics and physics, Herglotz's variational principle, named after German mathematician and physicist Gustav Herglotz, is an extension of the Hamilton's principle, where the Lagrangian L explicitly involves the action $S$ as an independent variable, and $S$ itself is represented as the solution of an ordinary differential equation (ODE) whose right hand side is the Lagrangian $L$, instead of an integration of $L$. Herglotz's variational principle is known as the variational principle for nonconservative Lagrange equations and Hamilton equations. It was first proposed in the context of contact geometry.

== Mathematical formulation ==
This presentation is from

=== Hamilton's principle ===
As in Lagrangian mechanics, we consider a system with $n$ degrees of freedom. Let $\boldsymbol q = (q_1, q_2, \dots, q_n)$ be its generalized coordinates, and let $\boldsymbol u = (u_1, u_2, \dots, u_n)$ be its generalized velocity. Let $L = L(t,\boldsymbol{q}, \boldsymbol{u})$ be the Lagrangian function of the physical system. Let $S$ be the action.

Lagrangian mechanics is derived using Hamilton's principle. Fix a starting time and configuration $t_0, \boldsymbol q_0$ and an ending time and configuration $t_1, \boldsymbol q_1$. Hamilton's principle states that physically real trajectories from are the solutions to the problem of variational calculus:
$$\begin{cases}
\delta \int_\gamma L(t, \gamma(t), \dot\gamma(t)) dt = 0 \\
\gamma \text{ has end points } t_0, \boldsymbol  q_0, t_1, \boldsymbol  q_1
\end{cases}$$
Equivalently, it can be formulated as
$$\begin{cases}
\delta S(t_1) = 0\\
\dot S (t) = L(t, \gamma (t), \dot \gamma (t)), & t \in [t_0, t_1] \\
S(t_0) = S_0 \\
\gamma \text{ has end points } t_0, \boldsymbol  q_0, t_1, \boldsymbol  q_1
\end{cases}$$

=== Herglotz's variational principle ===
Herglotz's variational principle simply generalizes by allowing the Lagrangian to depend on the action as well. It is of form $L = L(t,\boldsymbol{q}, \boldsymbol{u},S)$, depending on $2n+2$ variables.
$$\begin{cases}
\delta S(t_1) = 0\\
\dot S (t) = L(t, \gamma (t), \dot \gamma (t), S(t)), & t \in [t_0, t_1] \\
S(t_0) = S_0 \\
\gamma \text{ has end points } t_0, \boldsymbol  q_0, t_1, \boldsymbol  q_1
\end{cases}$$

=== Euler–Lagrange–Herglotz equation ===
Hamilton's variational principle gives the Euler–Langrange equations.
$$\frac{d}{d t} \left(\frac{\partial L}{\partial \dot \boldsymbol q}\right)
- \frac{\partial L}{\partial \boldsymbol q} = 0$$
Similarly, Herglotz's variational principle gives the Euler–Lagrange–Herglotz equations
$$\frac{d}{d t} \left(\frac{\partial L}{\partial \dot \boldsymbol q}\right)
- \frac{\partial L}{\partial \boldsymbol q} = \frac{\partial L}{\partial S} \frac{\partial L}{\partial \dot \boldsymbol q}$$
which involves an extra term $\frac{\partial L}{\partial S} \frac{\partial L}{\partial \dot \boldsymbol q}$ that can describe the dissipation of the system. The original Euler–Langrange equations are recovered as a special case when $\partial_S L = 0$.

=== Hamiltonian form ===
Similar to how Lagrangian mechanics is equivalent to Hamiltonian mechanics, the Lagrangian form of Herglotz principle is equivalent to a Hamiltonian form.

Define the momentum and Hamiltonian by taking a Legendre transformation
$$p_i := \frac{\partial L}{\partial u_i}, \quad H := \sum_i p_i u_i - L$$
Then the equations of motion are
$$\begin{cases}
\displaystyle \dot q_i = \frac{\partial H}{\partial p_i} \\[1ex]
\displaystyle \dot p_i = -\left(\frac{\partial H}{\partial q_i} + p_i \frac{\partial H}{\partial S}\right) \\[1ex]
\displaystyle \dot S = \sum_{i=1}^n p_i \frac{\partial H}{\partial p_i} - H
\end{cases}$$

=== Hamilton–Jacobi equation ===
If $S(t, q)$ is written as a function of time and configuration, then it satisfies a Hamilton–Jacobi equation
$$dS = -H\,dt + \sum_i p_i \, dq^i$$

== Derivation ==
In order to solve this minimization problem, we impose a variation $\delta \boldsymbol q$ on $\boldsymbol q$, and suppose $S(t)$ undergoes a variation $\delta S(t)$ correspondingly, then
$$\begin{aligned}
\delta \dot S(t) & = L (t, \boldsymbol q (t) + \delta \boldsymbol q (t), \dot \boldsymbol q(t) + \delta \dot \boldsymbol q (t), S(t) + \delta S(t)) - L (t, \boldsymbol q (t), \dot \boldsymbol q(t), S(t)) \\
& = \frac{\partial L}{\partial \boldsymbol q} \delta \boldsymbol q(t) + \frac{\partial L}{\partial \dot \boldsymbol q} \delta \dot \boldsymbol q(t) + \frac{\partial L}{\partial S} \delta S(t)
\end{aligned}$$
and since the initial condition is not changed, $\delta S_0 = 0$. The above equation a linear ODE for the function $\delta S(t)$, and it can be solved by introducing an integrating factor $\mu (t) = \exp\left(\int_{t_0}^t \frac{\partial L}{\partial S} dt\right)$, which is uniquely determined by the ODE
$$\dot{\mu }( t) =-\mu ( t)\frac{\partial L}{\partial S}, \quad u(t_0) = 1.$$
By multiplying $\mu(t)$ on both sides of the equation of $\delta \dot S$ and moving the term $\mu (t) \frac{\partial L}{\partial S} \delta S(t)$ to the left hand side, we get
$$\mu ( t) \delta \dot{S}( t) -\mu ( t)\frac{\partial L}{\partial S} \delta S( t) =\mu ( t)\left(\frac{\partial L}{\partial \boldsymbol{q}} \delta \boldsymbol{q}( t) +\frac{\partial L}{\partial \dot{\boldsymbol{q}}} \delta \dot{\boldsymbol{q}}( t)\right).$$
Note that, since $\dot{\mu }( t) =-\mu ( t)\frac{\partial L}{\partial S}$, the left hand side equals to
$$\mu ( t) \delta \dot{S}( t) +\dot{\mu }( t) \delta S( t) =\frac{d( \mu ( t) \delta S( t))}{d t}$$
and therefore we can do an integration of the equation above from $t=t_0$ to $t=t_1$, yielding
$$\mu ( t_1) \delta S_1 -\mu ( t_0) \delta S_0 =\int _{t_0}^{t_1} \mu ( t)\left(\frac{\partial L}{\partial \boldsymbol{q}} \delta \boldsymbol{q}( t) +\frac{\partial L}{\partial \dot{\boldsymbol{q}}} \delta \dot{\boldsymbol{q}}( t)\right)d t$$
where the $\delta S_0 = 0$ so the left hand side actually only contains one term $\mu(t_1) \delta S_1$, and for the right hand side, we can perform the integration-by-part on the $\frac{\partial L}{\partial \dot{\boldsymbol{q}}} \delta \dot{\boldsymbol{q}}( t)$ term to remove the time derivative on $\delta \boldsymbol{q}$:
$$\begin{aligned}
& \int _{t_0}^{t_1} \mu ( t)\left(\frac{\partial L}{\partial \boldsymbol{q}} \delta \boldsymbol{q}( t) +\frac{\partial L}{\partial \dot{\boldsymbol{q}}} \delta \dot{\boldsymbol{q}}( t)\right)d t\\
= & \int _{t_0}^{t_1} \mu ( t)\frac{\partial L}{\partial \boldsymbol{q}} \delta \boldsymbol{q}( t)d t+\int _{t_0}^{t_1} \mu ( t)\frac{\partial L}{\partial \dot{\boldsymbol{q}}} \delta \dot{\boldsymbol{q}}( t)d t\\
= & \int _{t_0}^{t_1} \mu ( t)\frac{\partial L}{\partial \boldsymbol{q}} \delta \boldsymbol{q}( t)d t+\mu ( t_1)\frac{\partial L}{\partial \dot{\boldsymbol{q}}}\underbrace{\delta {\boldsymbol{q}}( t_1)}_{=0} -\mu ( t_0)\frac{\partial L}{\partial \dot{\boldsymbol{q}}}\underbrace{\delta {\boldsymbol{q}}( t_0)}_{=0} -\int _{t_0}^{t_1}\frac{d}{d t}\left( \mu ( t)\frac{\partial L}{\partial \dot{\boldsymbol{q}}}\right) \delta \boldsymbol{q}( t)d t\\
= & \int _{t_0}^{t_1} \mu ( t)\frac{\partial L}{\partial \boldsymbol{q}} \delta \boldsymbol{q}( t)d t-\int _{t_0}^{t_1}\frac{d}{d t}\left( \mu ( t)\frac{\partial L}{\partial \dot{\boldsymbol{q}}}\right) \delta \boldsymbol{q}( t)d t\\
= & \int _{t_0}^{t_1} \mu ( t)\frac{\partial L}{\partial \boldsymbol{q}} \delta \boldsymbol{q}( t)d t-\int _{t_0}^{t_1}\left(\dot{\mu }( t)\frac{\partial L}{\partial \dot{\boldsymbol{q}}} +\mu ( t)\frac{d}{d t}\frac{\partial L}{\partial \dot{\boldsymbol{q}}}\right) \delta \boldsymbol{q}( t)d t\\
= & \int _{t_0}^{t_1} \mu ( t)\frac{\partial L}{\partial \boldsymbol{q}} \delta \boldsymbol{q}( t)d t-\int _{t_0}^{t_1}\left( -\mu ( t)\frac{\partial L}{\partial S}\frac{\partial L}{\partial \dot{\boldsymbol{q}}} +\mu ( t)\frac{d}{d t}\frac{\partial L}{\partial \dot{\boldsymbol{q}}}\right) \delta \boldsymbol{q}( t)d t\\
= & \int _{t_0}^{t_1} \mu ( t)\underline{\left(\frac{\partial L}{\partial \boldsymbol{q}} +\frac{\partial L}{\partial S}\frac{\partial L}{\partial \dot{\boldsymbol{q}}} -\frac{d}{d t}\frac{\partial L}{\partial \dot{\boldsymbol{q}}}\right)} \delta \boldsymbol{q}( t)d t,
\end{aligned}$$
and when $S_1$ is minimized, $\delta S_1 = 0$ for all $\delta \boldsymbol q$, which indicates that the underlined term in the last line of the equation above has to be zero on the entire interval $[t_0, t_1]$, this gives rise to the Euler–Lagrange–Herglotz equation.

== Noether's theorem ==
Generalizations of Noether's theorem and Noether's second theorem apply to Herglotz's variational principle.

An infinitesimal transformation is
$$\bar t = t + \varepsilon T(t, q), \quad \bar q  = q + \varepsilon Q(t, q)$$
where $T, Q$ are smooth functions of time and configuration, and $\varepsilon$ is an infinitesimal. The transformation deforms a trajectory $(t, q(t))$ to $(t + \varepsilon T(t, q), q(t) + \varepsilon Q(t, q))$, and accordingly deforms the action integral as well.

We say that the infinitesimal transformation is a symmetry of the action iff the change in $S(t_1) - S(t_0)$ under the infinitesimal transformation is order $O(\varepsilon^2)$. Given such an infinitesimal symmetry, the quantity is a constant of motion
$$\exp\left(-\int_{t_0}^{t} \frac{\partial L(t')}{\partial S} \, dt'\right) \left[T {\left(L - \dot q \frac{\partial L}{\partial \dot q} \right)} + Q \frac{\partial L}{\partial \dot q} \right]$$
where $\partial_S L(t')$ is more explicitly written as
$$\partial_S L(t', q(t'), \dot q(t'), S(t'))$$
There is also a version for multiple time dimensions.

== Examples ==
=== Damped particle on a line ===
The motion of a particle of mass $m$ in a potential field $V$ with damping coefficient $\gamma$ is
$$m \ddot x = -V'(x) - \gamma \dot x.$$
It can be produced as the Euler–Lagrange–Herglotz for
$$L(t,x,\dot x,S) = \tfrac{1}{2} m \dot x^2 - V(x) -\gamma S$$

=== A more general particle on a line ===
More generally, consider a particle on a line under the influence of 3 forces: a conservative force due to a potential field, a dissipative force proportional to $\dot x$, and another force proportional to $\dot x^2$. Write it as
$$\ddot{x}+f(x) \dot{x}^2+g(t) \dot{x} + h(x) = 0$$
This equation is the Euler–Lagrange–Herglotz equation for the Lagrangian
$$L = \tfrac{1}{2} \dot{x}^2 - \left[2 f(x) \dot{x} + g(t)\right] S - U(x)$$
where $U(x)$ is any solution of the ODE
$$\frac{dU(x)}{dx} + 2 f(x) U(x) = h(x) .$$
Some important special cases:

- When $f(x) = 0$ and $g(t)$ is constant, it is the damped harmonic oscillator given above.
- When $h(x)=x^n, f(x)=0$ and $g(t)=2 / t$, it is the Lane–Emden equation
  $$\ddot{x}+\frac{2}{t} \dot{x}+x^n=0, \quad n \neq-1 .$$
  with Lagrangian
  $$L=\frac{1}{2} \dot{x}^2-\frac{x^{n+1}}{n+1}-\frac{2}{t} z .$$
- When $h(x)=0$, it is a Rayleigh-type system
  $$\ddot{x}+f(x) \dot{x}^2+g(t) \dot{x}=0 .$$
  with Lagrangian
  $$L = \tfrac{1}{2} \dot{x}^2 - \left[2 f(x) \dot{x} + g(t)\right] z .$$
