= Riesz's lemma =

Mathematics lemma in functional analysis

In mathematics, Riesz's lemma (after Frigyes Riesz) is a lemma in functional analysis. It specifies (often easy to check) conditions that guarantee that a subspace in a normed vector space is dense. The lemma may also be called the Riesz lemma or Riesz inequality. It can be seen as a substitute for orthogonality when the normed space is not an inner product space.

== Statement ==
Riesz's lemma—Let $Y$ be a closed proper vector subspace of a normed space $(X, \|\cdot\|)$ and let $\alpha$ be any real number satisfying $0 < \alpha < 1.$ Then there exists a vector $u$ in $X$ of unit norm $\|u\| = 1$ such that $\|u - y\| \geq \alpha$ for all $y$ in $Y.$

If $X$ is a reflexive Banach space then this conclusion is also true when $\alpha = 1.$

Metric reformulation

As usual, let $d(x, y) := \|x - y\|$ denote the canonical metric induced by the norm, call the set $\{x \in X : \|x\| = 1\}$ of all vectors that are a distance of $1$ from the origin the unit sphere, and denote the distance from a point $u$ to the set $Y \subseteq X$ by
$$d(u, Y) ~:=~ \inf_{y \in Y} d(u, y) ~=~ \inf_{y \in Y} \|u - y\|.$$
The inequality $\alpha \leq d(u, Y)$ holds if and only if $\|u - y\| \geq \alpha$ for all $y \in Y,$ and it formally expresses the notion that the distance between $u$ and $Y$ is at least $\alpha.$ Because every vector subspace (such as $Y$) contains the origin $0,$ substituting $y := 0$ in this infimum shows that $d(u, Y) \leq \|u\|$ for every vector $u \in X.$ In particular, $d(u, Y) \leq 1$ when $\|u\| = 1$ is a unit vector.

Using this new notation, the conclusion of Riesz's lemma may be restated more succinctly as: $d(u, Y) \geq \alpha$ holds for some unit vector $u \in X.$

Using this new terminology, Riesz's lemma may also be restated in plain English as:

Given any closed proper vector subspace of a normed space $X,$ for any desired minimum distance $\alpha$ less than $1,$ there exists some vector in the unit sphere of $X$ that is at least this desired distance away from the subspace.

=== Special cases ===
When $X = \{0\}$, it is a trivial vector space, so then it has no proper vector subspace $Y,$ and so Riesz's lemma holds vacuously for all real numbers $\alpha \in \R.$ The remainder of this section will assume that $X \neq \{0\},$ which guarantees that a unit vector exists.

The inclusion of the hypotheses $0 < \alpha < 1$ can be explained by considering the three cases: $\alpha \leq 0$, $\alpha = 1,$ and $\alpha > 1.$ The lemma holds when $\alpha \leq 0$ since every unit vector $u \in X$ satisfies the conclusion $\alpha \leq 0 \leq d(u, Y) \leq 1 = \|u\|.$ The hypotheses $0 < \alpha$ is included solely to exclude this trivial case and is sometimes omitted from the lemma's statement.

Riesz's lemma is always false when $\alpha > 1$ because for every unit vector $u \in X,$ the required inequality $\|u - y\| \geq \alpha$ fails to hold for $y := 0 \in Y$ (since $\|u - 0\| = 1 < \alpha$). Another consequence of $d(u, Y) > 1$ being impossible is that the inequality $d(u, Y) \geq 1$ holds if and only if equality $d(u, Y) = 1$ holds.

== Proof ==
Illustration for the proof. $0, y_0, v, v-y_0$ are drawn as the corners of a parallelogram. The dashed line through $0$ and $y_0$ is the closed sub‑space $Y$. The first curve centred at $v$, passing through $y_0$, shows the ball of radius $|v-y_0|$. The second curve centred at $v-y_0$, passing through $0$ shows the same radius after translation. Scaling up $v-y_0$ yields a new unit vector $v'$ for which $d(v', Y)$ may be arbitrarily close to 1.

The proof can be found in functional analysis texts such as Kreyszig.

Proof

Consider any $v\in X - Y$ and denote its distance from $Y$ by $a$. Clearly, $a>0$ since $Y$ is closed. Take any $\alpha \in(0,1)$. By the definition of an infimum, there is a $y_0 \in Y$ such that

$a \leq\left\|v-y_0\right\| \leq \frac{a}{\alpha}$	1

(note that $a / \alpha > a$ since $0<\alpha<1$). Let

$$z=c\left(v-y_0\right) \quad \text { where } \quad c=\frac{1}{\left\|v-y_0\right\|} .$$

Then $\|z\|=1$, and we show that $\|z-y\| \geq \alpha$ for every $y \in Y$. We have

$$\begin{aligned}
\|z-y\| & =\left\|c\left(v-y_0\right)-y\right\| \\
& =c\left\|v-y_0-c^{-1} y\right\| \\
& =c\left\|v-y_1\right\|
\end{aligned}$$

where

$$y_1=y_0+c^{-1} y .$$

The form of $y_1$ shows that $y_1 \in Y$. Hence $\left\|v-y_1\right\| \geq a$, by the definition of $a$. Writing $c$ out and using (1), we obtain

$$\|z-y\|=c\left\|v-y_1\right\| \geq c a=\frac{a}{\left\|v-y_0\right\|} \geq \frac{a}{a / \alpha}=\alpha .$$

Since $y \in Y$ was arbitrary, this completes the proof.

== Reflexivity ==
If we set $\alpha = 1$, then the statement of Riesz’s lemma becomes:

For every closed proper vector subspace $Y$ of $X,$ there exists some vector $u$ of unit norm that satisfies $d(u, Y) = 1.$

When $X$ is a Banach space, then this statement is true if and only if $X$ is a reflexive space. That is, a Banach space $X$ is reflexive if and only if for every closed proper vector subspace $Y,$ there is some vector $u$ on the unit sphere of $X$ that is always at least a distance of $1 = d(u, Y)$ away from the subspace. This gives a geometrically intuitive definition for reflexivity.

=== Examples ===
Since every finite dimensional normed space is a reflexive Banach space, Riesz’s lemma does hold for $\alpha = 1$ when the normed space is finite-dimensional, as will now be shown. When the dimension of $X$ is finite then the closed unit ball $B \subseteq X$ is compact. Since the distance function $d(\cdot, Y)$ is continuous, its image on the closed unit ball $B$ must be a compact subset of the real line, proving the claim. The "perpendicular" vector may be found pictorially by drawing a unit sphere that is supported by $Y$ at the origin.

For example, if the reflexive Banach space $X = \Reals^3$ is endowed with the usual $\|\cdot\|_2$ Euclidean norm and if $Y = \Reals \times \Reals \times \{0\}$ is the $x\text{-}y$ plane then the points $u = (0, 0, \pm 1)$ satisfy the conclusion $d(u, Y) = 1.$ If $Z = \{(0, 0)\} \times \Reals$ is $z$-axis then every point $u$ belonging to the unit circle in the $x\text{-}y$ plane satisfies the conclusion $d(u, Z) = 1.$ But if $X = \Reals^3$ was endowed with the $\|\cdot\|_1$ taxicab norm (instead of the Euclidean norm), then the conclusion $d(u, Z) = 1$ would be satisfied by every point $u = (x, y, 0)$ belonging to the “diamond” $|x| + |y| = 1$ in the $x\text{-}y$ plane (a square with vertices at $(\pm 1, 0, 0)$ and $(0, \pm 1, 0)$).

=== Non-examples ===
Equivalently stated, a Banach space is non-reflexive if and only if Riesz’s lemma does not hold for $\alpha = 1$.

For example, the Lebesgue space $\ell_\infty(\N)$ of all bounded sequences is non-reflexive, and $\ell_1(\N)$ is non-reflexive, too. More examples on the reflexivity page.

== Applications ==
=== Characterization of finite dimension ===
Riesz's lemma guarantees that for any given $0 < \alpha < 1,$ every infinite-dimensional normed space contains a sequence $x_1, x_2, \ldots$ of (distinct) unit vectors satisfying $\|x_n - x_m\| > \alpha$ for $m \neq n;$ or stated in plain English, these vectors are all separated from each other by a distance of more than $\alpha$ while simultaneously also all lying on the unit sphere. Such an infinite sequence of vectors cannot be found in the unit sphere of any finite dimensional normed space (just consider for example the unit circle in $\Reals^2$).

This sequence can be constructed by induction for any constant $0 < \alpha < 1.$ Start by picking any element $x_1$ from the unit sphere. Let $Y_{n-1}$ be the linear span of $\{x_1, \ldots, x_{n-1}\}$ and (using Riesz's lemma) pick $x_n$ from the unit sphere such that

$d\left(x_n, Y_{n-1}\right) > \alpha$ where $d(x_n, Y) = \inf_{y \in Y} \|x_n - y\|.$

This sequence $x_1, x_2, \ldots$ contains no convergent subsequence, which implies that the closed unit ball is not compact.

Thus, if $X$ is a normed vector space, then $X$ is finite dimensional if and only if the closed unit ball in $X$ is compact.

In particular, the identity operator on a Banach space $X$ is compact if and only if $X$ is finite-dimensional.

More generally, a topological vector space $X$ is finite dimensional if and only if it is locally compact. This classical result is also attributed to Riesz.

Proof sketch: Let $C$ be a compact neighborhood of the origin in $X.$ By compactness, there are $c_1, \ldots, c_n \in C$ such that
$$C ~\subseteq~ \left(c_1 + \tfrac{1}{2} C\right) \cup \cdots \cup \left(c_n + \tfrac{1}{2} C\right).$$

We claim that the finite dimensional subspace $Y$ spanned by $\{c_1, \ldots, c_n\}$ is dense in $X,$ or equivalently, its closure is $X.$ Since $X$ is the union of scalar multiples of $C,$ it is sufficient to show that $C \subseteq Y.$ By induction, for every $m,$
$$C ~\subseteq~ Y + \frac{1}{2^m} C.$$
But compact sets are bounded, so $C$ lies in the closure of $Y.$ This proves the result.

For a different proof based on Hahn–Banach theorem see Crespín (1994).

=== Banach space theory ===
The spectral properties of compact operators acting on a Banach space are similar to those of matrices. Riesz's lemma is essential in establishing this fact.

A particular case of the previous section is that the identity operator on a Banach space $X$ is a compact operator if and only if $X$ is finite-dimensional.

As detailed in the article on infinite-dimensional Lebesgue measure, Riesz's lemma is useful in showing the non-existence of certain measures on infinite-dimensional Banach spaces.

== See also ==
- F. Riesz's theorem
- James's Theorem—a characterization of reflexivity given by a condition on the unit ball
