= Radon–Riesz property =

The Radon–Riesz property is a mathematical property for normed spaces that helps ensure convergence in norm. Given two assumptions (essentially weak convergence and continuity of norm), we would like to ensure convergence in the norm topology.

== Definition ==
Suppose that (X, ||·||) is a normed space. We say that X has the Radon–Riesz property (or that X is a Radon–Riesz space) if whenever $(x_{n})$ is a sequence in the space and $x$ is a member of X such that $(x_{n})$ converges weakly to $x$ and $\lim_{n\to\infty} \Vert x_n \Vert = \Vert x\Vert$, then $(x_{n})$ converges to $x$ in norm; that is, $\lim_{n\to\infty} \Vert x_n - x\Vert = 0$.

== Other names ==
Although it would appear that Johann Radon was one of the first to make significant use of this property in 1913, M. I. Kadets and V. L. Klee also used versions of the Radon–Riesz property to make advancements in Banach space theory in the late 1920s. It is common for the Radon–Riesz property to also be referred to as the Kadets–Klee property or property (H). According to Robert Megginson, the letter H does not stand for anything. It was simply referred to as property (H) in a list of properties for normed spaces that starts with (A) and ends with (H). This list was given by K. Fan and I. Glicksberg (Observe that the definition of (H) given by Fan and Glicksberg includes additionally the rotundity of the norm, so it does not coincide with the Radon-Riesz property itself). The "Riesz" part of the name refers to Frigyes Riesz. He also made some use of this property in the 1920s.

It is important to know that the name "Kadets-Klee property" is used sometimes to speak about the coincidence of the weak topologies and norm topologies in the unit sphere of the normed space.

== Examples ==
1. Every real Hilbert space is a Radon–Riesz space. Indeed, suppose that H is a real Hilbert space and that $(x_{n})$ is a sequence in H converging weakly to a member $x$ of H. Using the two assumptions on the sequence and the fact that

$$\langle x_{n} - x, x_{n} - x\rangle = \langle x_{n} , x_{n} \rangle - \langle x_{n} ,  x\rangle  - \langle  x, x_{n} \rangle + \langle  x,  x\rangle,$$

and letting n tend to infinity, we see that

$$\lim_{n\to\infty}{\langle x_{n} - x, x_{n} - x\rangle} = 0.$$

Thus H is a Radon–Riesz space.

2. Every uniformly convex Banach space is a Radon-Riesz space. See Section 3.7 of Haim Brezis' Functional analysis.

== See also ==
- Johann Radon
- Frigyes Riesz
- Hilbert space or Banach space theory
- Weak topology
- Normed space
- Functional analysis
- Schur's property
