= Marcel Riesz =

Hungarian mathematician

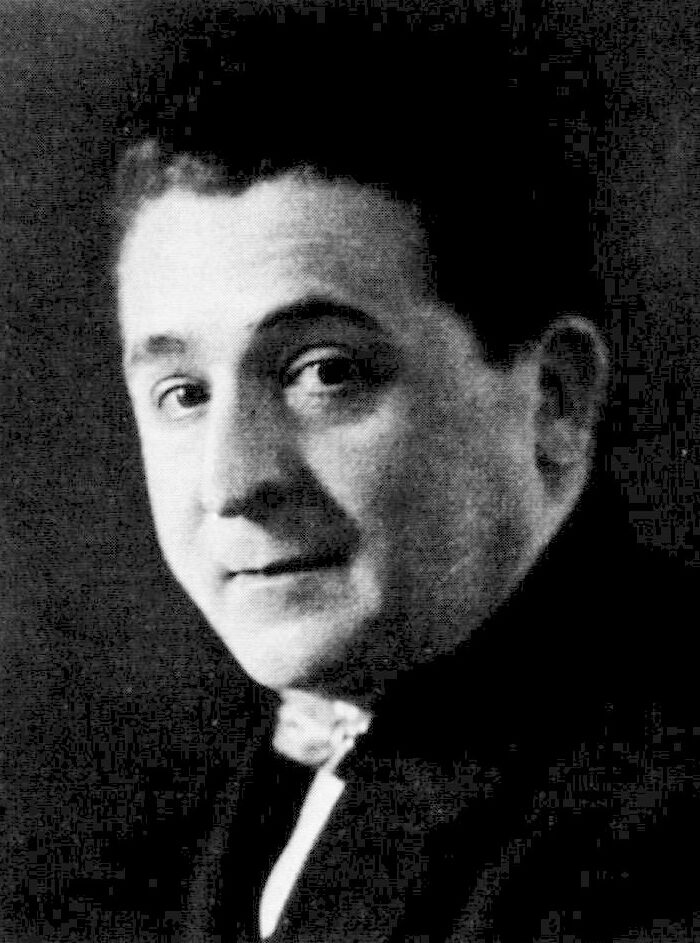
- Riesz c. 1930.
- Born: 16 November 1886; Győr, Austria-Hungary
- Died: 4 September 1969 (aged 82); Lund, Sweden
- Known for: Riesz–Thorin theorem M. Riesz extension theorem F. and M. Riesz theorem Riesz potential Riesz function Riesz transform Riesz mean
- Scientific career
- Fields: Mathematics
- Workplaces: Lund University
- Doctoral advisor: Lipót Fejér
- Doctoral students: Harald Cramér; Otto Frostman; Lars Gårding; Einar Carl Hille; Lars Hörmander; Olof Thorin

Marcel Riesz (Hungarian: Riesz Marcell [ˈriːs ˈmɒrt͡sɛll]; 16 November 1886 – 4 September 1969) was a Hungarian mathematician, known for work on summation methods, potential theory, and other parts of analysis, as well as number theory, partial differential equations, and Clifford algebras. He spent most of his career in Lund, Sweden.

Marcel is the younger brother of Frigyes Riesz, who was also an important mathematician and at times they worked together (see F. and M. Riesz theorem).

== Biography ==
Marcel Riesz was born in Győr, Austria-Hungary. He was the younger brother of the mathematician Frigyes Riesz. In 1904, he won the Loránd Eötvös competition. Upon entering the Budapest University, he also studied in Göttingen, and the academic year 1910-11 he spent in Paris. Earlier, in 1908, he attended the 1908 International Congress of Mathematicians in Rome. There he met Gösta Mittag-Leffler, in three years, Mittag-Leffler would offer Riesz to come to Sweden.

Riesz obtained his PhD at Eötvös Loránd University under the supervision of Lipót Fejér. In 1911, he moved to Sweden, where from 1911 to 1925 he taught at Stockholm University.

From 1926 to 1952, he was a professor at Lund University. According to Lars Gårding, Riesz arrived in Lund as a renowned star of mathematics, and for a time his appointment may have seemed like an exile. Indeed, there was no established school of mathematics in Lund at the time. However, Riesz managed to turn the tables around and make the academic atmosphere more active.

Retired from the Lund University, he spent 10 years at universities in the United States. As a visiting research professor, he worked in Maryland, Chicago, etc. As visiting professor at University of Maryland he published, through the Institute for Fluid Dynamics and Applied Mathematics, his Clifford Numbers and Spinors in 1958.

After ten years of intense work with little rest, he suffered a breakdown. Riesz returned to Lund in 1962. After a long illness, he died there in 1969.

Riesz was elected a member of the Royal Swedish Academy of Sciences in 1936.

== Mathematical work ==
=== Classical analysis ===
The work of Riesz as a student of Fejér in Budapest was devoted to trigonometric series:

$$\frac{a_0}{2} + \sum_{n=1}^\infty \left\{ a_n \cos (nx) + b_n \sin(nx) \right\}.\,$$

One of his results states that if

$$\sum_{n=1}^\infty \frac{|a_n|+|b_n|}{n^2} < \infty,\,$$

and if the Fejer means of the series tend to zero, then all the coefficients a_{n} and b_{n} are zero.

His results on summability of trigonometric series include a generalisation of Fejér's theorem to Cesàro means of arbitrary order. He also studied the summability of power and Dirichlet series, and coauthored a book Hardy & Riesz (1915) on the latter with G.H. Hardy.

In 1916, he introduced the Riesz interpolation formula for trigonometric polynomials, which allowed him to give a new proof of Bernstein's inequality.

He also introduced the Riesz function Riesz(x), and showed that the Riemann hypothesis is equivalent to the bound {{{1}}} as x → ∞, for any ε > 0.

Together with his brother Frigyes Riesz, he proved the F. and M. Riesz theorem, which implies, in particular, that if μ is a complex measure on the unit circle such that

$$\int z^n d\mu(z) = 0, n=1,2,3\cdots,\,$$

then the variation |μ| of μ and the Lebesgue measure on the circle are mutually absolutely continuous.

=== Functional-analytic methods ===
Part of the analytic work of Riesz in the 1920s used methods of functional analysis.

In the early 1920s, he worked on the moment problem, to which he introduced the operator-theoretic approach by proving the Riesz extension theorem (which predated the closely related Hahn–Banach theorem).

Later, he devised an interpolation theorem to show that the Hilbert transform is a bounded operator in L_{p} (1 < p < ∞). The generalisation of the interpolation theorem by his student Olaf Thorin is now known as the Riesz–Thorin theorem.

Riesz also established, independently of Andrey Kolmogorov, what is now called the Kolmogorov–Riesz compactness criterion in L_{p}: a subset K ⊂L_{p}(R^{n}) is precompact if and only if the following three conditions hold: (a) K is bounded;

(b) for every ε > 0 there exists R > 0 so that

$$\int_{|x|>R} |f(x)|^p dx < \epsilon^p\,$$

for every f ∈ K;

(c) for every ε > 0 there exists ρ > 0 so that

$$\int_{\mathbb{R}^n} |f(x+y)-f(x)|^p dx < \epsilon^p\,$$

for every y ∈ R^{n} with |y| < ρ, and every f ∈ K.

=== Potential theory, PDE, and Clifford algebras ===
After 1930, the interests of Riesz shifted to potential theory and partial differential equations. He made use of "generalised potentials", generalisations of the Riemann–Liouville integral. In particular, Riesz discovered the Riesz potential, a generalisation of the Riemann–Liouville integral to dimension higher than one.

In the 1940s and 1950s, Riesz worked on Clifford algebras. His 1958 lecture notes, the complete version of which was only published in 1993 (Riesz (1993)), were dubbed by the physicist David Hestenes "the midwife of the rebirth" of Clifford algebras.

=== Students ===
Riesz's doctoral students in Stockholm include Harald Cramér and Einar Carl Hille. In Lund, Riesz supervised the theses of Otto Frostman, Lars Gårding, Lars Hörmander, and Olof Thorin.

== Publications ==
- Hardy, G. H.; Riesz, M. (1915). The general theory of Dirichlet's series. Cambridge University Press. JFM 45.0387.03.
- Riesz, Marcel (1988). Collected papers. Berlin, New York: Springer-Verlag. ISBN 978-3-540-18115-6. MR 0962287.
- Riesz, Marcel (1993) [1958]. Clifford numbers and spinors. Fundamental Theories of Physics. Vol. 54. Dordrecht: Kluwer Academic Publishers Group. ISBN 978-0-7923-2299-3. MR 1247961.
