= F. and M. Riesz theorem =

In mathematics, the F. and M. Riesz theorem is a result of the brothers Frigyes Riesz and Marcel Riesz, on analytic measures. It states that for a measure μ on the circle, any part of μ that is not absolutely continuous with respect to the Lebesgue measure dθ can be detected by means of Fourier coefficients. More precisely, it states that if the Fourier–Stieltjes coefficients of $\mu$ satisfy

$$\hat\mu_n=\int_0^{2\pi}{\rm e}^{-in\theta}\frac{
\mu(d\theta)}{2\pi}=0,\$$

for all $n<0$, then μ is absolutely continuous with respect to dθ.

The original statements are rather different (see Zygmund, Trigonometric Series, VII.8). The formulation here is as in Walter Rudin, Real and Complex Analysis, p. 335. The proof given uses the Poisson kernel and the existence of boundary values for the Hardy space H^{1}.

Expansions to this theorem were made by James E. Weatherbee in his 1968 dissertation: Some Extensions Of The F. And M. Riesz Theorem On Absolutely Continuous Measures.
