= M. Riesz extension theorem =

Mathematical theorem that Linear Fnctions have Positive Extensions in Real Vectorspace

The M. Riesz extension theorem is a theorem in mathematics proven by Marcel Riesz during his study of the problem of moments.

== Formulation ==
Let $E$ be a real vector space, $F \subseteq E$ a vector subspace, and $K \subseteq E$ a convex cone.

A linear functional $\phi: F\to\mathbb{R}$ is called $K$-positive (or just positive) if it takes only non-negative values on the cone $K$:

$$\phi(x) \geq 0 \text{ for all } x \in F \cap K.$$

A linear functional $\psi: E\to\mathbb{R}$ is called a positive extension of $\phi$ if it is $K$-positive and its restriction to $F$ is equal to $\phi$:

$$\psi|_F = \phi \text{ and } \psi(x) \geq 0 \text{ for all } x \in K.$$

In general, a positive linear functional on a vector subspace need not have any positive linear extensions to the whole space. For example, let $E = \mathbb{R}^2$ be the plane, let $F = \{(x,0) : x\in\mathbb{R}\}$ be the x-axis, and let $K = \{(x,y): x\in\mathbb{R}, y>0\} \cup \{(x,0): x \geq 0\}$ be the upper half-plane with the negative x-axis removed. Define $\phi:F \to \mathbb{R}$ by $\phi(x,0)=x$ for all $x\in\mathbb{R}$. Then $\phi$ is a positive linear functional, but every linear extension of $\phi$ to $E$ attains a negative value somewhere in $K$.

However, a positive linear extension exists under the additional assumption that $E \subseteq K+F$, which is to say that for every $y\in E$, there exists an $x\in F$ and a $k\in K$ such that $y = x+k$. (Equivalently, for all $y\in E$, there exists an $x\in F$ such that $y-x \in K$.)

M. Riesz extension theorem—Let $E$ be a real vector space, $F \subseteq E$ a subspace, and $K \subseteq E$ a convex cone such that $E \subseteq K+F$. Then every $K$-positive linear functional $\phi\colon F\to\mathbb R$ has a $K$-positive linear extension to all of $E$.

== Proof ==
The proof is similar to the proof of the Hahn–Banach theorem (see also below).

By transfinite induction or Zorn's lemma, it is sufficient to consider the case where dim $E/F = 1$.

Choose any $y \in E \setminus F$. Set

$$\begin{align}
a &= \sup \{\phi(x) : x \in F, y-x \in K \}, \\
b &= \inf \{\phi(x) : x \in F, x-y \in K \}.
\end{align}$$

We will prove that $-\infty < a \leq b$. For now, choose any $c$ satisfying $a \leq c \leq b$, and set $\psi(y) = c$ and $\psi|_F = \phi$, and then extend $\psi$ to all of $E$ by linearity. We need to show that $\psi$ is $K$-positive, so let $z \in K$. By the assumption that $F$ has codimension 1, there exist $x\in F$ and an $\alpha\in\mathbb{R}$ such that $z = x+\alpha y$. By construction, $\psi(z) = \phi(x) + \alpha c$, and we must show that $\psi(z) \geq 0$.

If $\alpha = 0$, then $z\in F \cap K$, and so $\psi(z) = \phi(x) \geq 0$.

Suppose $\alpha > 0$. Since $K$ is a cone, $\frac{1}{\alpha}z \in K$, and we have $\frac{1}{\alpha}z = y - \left(-\frac{1}{\alpha}x\right) \in K$. Hence, $-\frac{1}{\alpha}x$ belongs to the set defining $a$, so

$$a \geq \phi\left( -\frac{1}{\alpha}x \right) = -\frac{1}{\alpha}\phi(x).$$

Multiplying by $\alpha$ and adding $\phi(x)$ gives $\phi(x) + \alpha a \geq 0$, and since $c \geq a$ and $\alpha > 0$, we have

$$\psi(z) = \phi(x) + \alpha c \geq \phi(x) + \alpha a \geq 0.$$

Now suppose $\alpha < 0$. Set $\beta = -\alpha > 0$. Then $z = x - \beta y$ and $\frac{1}{\beta}z = \frac{1}{\beta}x - y \in K$. Therefore $\frac{1}{\beta} x$ belongs to the set defining $b$, so

$$b \geq \phi\left( \frac{1}{\beta}x \right) = \frac{1}{\beta}\phi(x).$$

Multiplying by $\beta$ and adding $\phi(x)$ gives $\phi(x) \geq \beta b = -\alpha b$. Since $c \leq b$ and $\alpha < 0$, multiplying by $\alpha$ reverses the inequality and gives $\alpha c \geq \alpha b$, and so

$$\psi(z) = \phi(x) + \alpha c \geq -\alpha b + \alpha b = 0.$$

This shows that, in all cases, $\psi(z) \geq 0$.

We now prove that $-\infty < a \leq b$. Notice that, by assumption, there exists at least one $x \in F$ such that $y - x \in K$, and so $-\infty < a$. However, it may be the case that there are no $x \in F$ for which $x - y \in K$, in which case $b = \infty$ and the inequality is trivial (in this case, notice that the second case above cannot happen). Therefore, we may assume that $b < \infty$ and there is at least one $x \in F$ for which $x - y \in K$. To prove the inequality, it suffices to show that whenever $x \in F$ and $y - x \in K$, and $x' \in F$ and $x' - y \in K$, then $\phi(x) \le \phi(x')$. Indeed,

$$x' -x = (x' - y) + (y-x) \in K$$

since $K$ is a convex cone, and so

$$0 \leq \phi(x'-x) = \phi(x')-\phi(x)$$

since $\phi$ is $K$-positive.

== Corollary: Krein's extension theorem ==
Let E be a real linear space, and let K ⊂ E be a convex cone. Let x ∈ E/(−K) be such that R x + K = E. Then there exists a K-positive linear functional φ: E → R such that φ(x) > 0.

== Connection to the Hahn–Banach theorem ==
The Hahn–Banach theorem can be deduced from the M. Riesz extension theorem.

Let V be a linear space, and let N be a sublinear function on V. Let φ be a functional on a subspace U ⊂ V that is dominated by N:

$$\phi(x) \leq N(x), \quad x \in U.$$

The Hahn–Banach theorem asserts that φ can be extended to a linear functional on V that is dominated by N.

To derive this from the M. Riesz extension theorem, define a convex cone K ⊂ R×V by

$$K = \left\{ (a, x) \, \mid \, N(x) \leq a \right\}.$$

Define a functional φ_{1} on R×U by

$$\phi_1(a, x) = a - \phi(x).$$

One can see that φ_{1} is K-positive, and that K + (R × U) = R × V. Therefore φ_{1} can be extended to a K-positive functional ψ_{1} on R×V. Then

$$\psi(x) = - \psi_1(0, x)$$

is the desired extension of φ. Indeed, if ψ(x) > N(x), we have: (N(x), x) ∈ K, whereas

$$\psi_1(N(x), x) = N(x) - \psi(x) < 0,$$

leading to a contradiction.

== Sources ==
- Castillo, Reńe E. (2005), "A note on Krein's theorem" (PDF), Lecturas Matematicas, 26, archived from the original (PDF) on 2014-02-01
- Riesz, M. (1923), "Sur le problème des moments. III.", Arkiv för Matematik, Astronomi och Fysik (in French), 17 (16), JFM 49.0195.01
- Akhiezer, N.I. (1965), The classical moment problem and some related questions in analysis, New York: Hafner Publishing Co., MR 0184042
