= Frigyes Riesz =

Hungarian mathematician

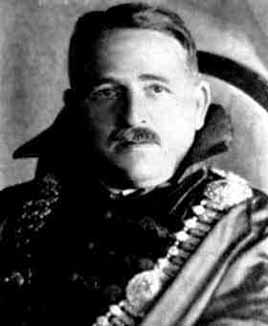
- Born: 22 January 1880; Győr, Austria-Hungary
- Died: 28 February 1956 (aged 76); Budapest, Hungary
- Citizenship: Hungarian
- Known for: Functional analysis Integral equations Ergodic theory Weak topology Hardy space L^{p} space Proximity space Denjoy–Riesz theorem Herglotz–Riesz representation theorem Riesz space Riesz rearrangement inequality Riesz's lemma Riesz representation theorem Riesz–Fischer theorem Riesz projector Radon–Riesz property F. and M. Riesz theorem F. Riesz's theorem Riesz–Markov–Kakutani representation theorem
- Scientific career
- Fields: Mathematics
- Doctoral advisor: Gyula Vályi
- Doctoral students: János Aczél; Steven Gaal; John Horvath; Tibor Radó; Alfréd Rényi

Frigyes Riesz (Hungarian: Riesz Frigyes, pronounced [ˈriːs ˈfriɟɛʃ], sometimes known in English and French as Frederic Riesz; 22 January 1880 – 28 February 1956) was a Hungarian mathematician who made fundamental contributions to functional analysis, as did his younger brother Marcel Riesz.

== Life and career ==
He was born into a Jewish family in Győr, Austria-Hungary and died in Budapest, Hungary. Between 1911 and 1919 he was a professor at the Franz Joseph University in Kolozsvár, Austria-Hungary. The post-WW1 Treaty of Trianon transferred former Austro-Hungarian territory including Kolozsvár to the Kingdom of Romania, whereupon Kolozsvár's name changed to Cluj and the University of Kolozsvár moved to Szeged, Hungary, becoming the University of Szeged. Then, Riesz was the rector and a professor at the University of Szeged, as well as a member of the Hungarian Academy of Sciences and the Polish Academy of Learning. He was the older brother of the mathematician Marcel Riesz.

Riesz did some of the fundamental work in developing functional analysis and his work has had a number of important applications in physics. He established the spectral theory for bounded symmetric operators in a form very much like that now regarded as standard. He also made many contributions to other areas including ergodic theory, topology and he gave an elementary proof of the mean ergodic theorem.

Together with Alfréd Haar, Riesz founded the Acta Scientiarum Mathematicarum journal.

He had an uncommon method of giving lectures: he entered the lecture hall with an assistant and a docent. The docent then began reading the proper passages from Riesz's handbook and the assistant wrote the appropriate equations on the blackboard—while Riesz himself stood aside, nodding occasionally.

The Swiss-American mathematician Edgar Lorch spent 1934 in Szeged working under Riesz and wrote a reminiscence about his time there, including his collaboration with Riesz.

The corpus of his bibliography was compiled by the mathematician Pál Medgyessy.

== Publications ==
- Riesz, Frederic; Sz.-Nagy, Béla (1990) [1955]. Functional Analysis. Translated by Boron, Leo F. New York: Dover Publications. ISBN 0-486-66289-6. OCLC 21228994.

== See also ==
- Proximity space
- Rising sun lemma
- Denjoy–Riesz theorem
- F. and M. Riesz theorem
- Riesz representation theorem
- Riesz–Fischer theorem
- Riesz groups
- Riesz's lemma
- Riesz projector
- Riesz sequence
- Riesz space
- Radon–Riesz property
