= F. Riesz's theorem =

In mathematics, F. Riesz's theorem (named after Frigyes Riesz) is a theorem in functional analysis that states that a Hausdorff topological vector space is finite-dimensional if and only if it is locally compact. The theorem and its consequences are used ubiquitously in functional analysis, often used without being explicitly mentioned.

== Statement ==
Recall that a topological vector space (TVS) $X$ is Hausdorff if and only if the singleton set $\{ 0 \}$ consisting entirely of the origin is a closed subset of $X.$ A map between two TVSs is called a TVS-isomorphism or an isomorphism in the category of TVSs if it is a linear homeomorphism.

F. Riesz theorem—A Hausdorff TVS $X$ over the field $\mathbb{F}$ ( $\mathbb{F}$ is either the real or complex numbers) is finite-dimensional if and only if it is locally compact (or equivalently, if and only if there exists a compact neighborhood of the origin). In this case, $X$ is TVS-isomorphic to $\mathbb{F}^{\text{dim} X}.$

== Consequences ==
Throughout, $F, X, Y$ are TVSs (not necessarily Hausdorff) with $F$ a finite-dimensional vector space.

- Every finite-dimensional vector subspace of a Hausdorff TVS is a closed subspace.
- All finite-dimensional Hausdorff TVSs are Banach spaces and all norms on such a space are equivalent.
- If $M$ is a closed vector subspace of a TVS $Y$ and if $F$ is a finite-dimensional vector subspace of $Y$ then $M + F$ is a closed vector subspace of $Y.$
- Every linear bijection between two finite-dimensional Hausdorff TVSs is a TVS isomorphism.
- If $\tau_1$ and $\tau_2$ are Hausdorff TVS topologies on the same finite-dimensional vector space then $\tau_1 = \tau_2.$
- A linear map $L : F \to Y$ between Hausdorff TVSs is necessarily continuous.
  - In particular, every linear functional of a finite-dimensional Hausdorff TVS is continuous.
- Any continuous surjective linear map $L : X \to Y$ with a Hausdorff finite-dimensional range is an open map and thus a topological homomorphism. In particular, the range of $L$ is TVS-isomorphic to $X / L^{-1}(0).$
- A TVS $X$ is locally compact if and only if $X / \overline{\{ 0 \}}$ is finite dimensional.
- The convex hull of a compact subset of a finite-dimensional Hausdorff TVS is compact.
  - In particular, the convex hull of a compact set is equal to the closed convex hull of that set.
- A locally bounded Hausdorff TVS with the Heine-Borel property is finite-dimensional.

== See also ==
- Riesz's lemma – Mathematics lemma in functional analysis

== Bibliography ==
- Rudin, Walter (1991). Functional Analysis. International Series in Pure and Applied Mathematics. Vol. 8 (Second ed.). New York, NY: McGraw-Hill Science/Engineering/Math. ISBN 978-0-07-054236-5. OCLC 21163277.
- Narici, Lawrence; Beckenstein, Edward (2011). Topological Vector Spaces. Pure and applied mathematics (Second ed.). Boca Raton, FL: CRC Press. ISBN 978-1584888666. OCLC 144216834.
- Schaefer, Helmut H.; Wolff, Manfred P. (1999). Topological Vector Spaces. GTM. Vol. 8 (Second ed.). New York, NY: Springer New York Imprint Springer. ISBN 978-1-4612-7155-0. OCLC 840278135.
- Trèves, François (2006) [1967]. Topological Vector Spaces, Distributions and Kernels. Mineola, N.Y.: Dover Publications. ISBN 978-0-486-45352-1. OCLC 853623322.
