= List of University of Szeged people =

The list of University of Szeged people includes notable graduates and nongraduates; professors; and administrators affiliated with the University of Szeged, located in Szeged, Hungary.

Name	Known for	Relationship to the university	Link
István Bibó (1911–79)	political scientist; member of the Hungarian Academy of Sciences (1946–49)	doctor's degree from the University of Law, Szeged (1934); lecturer (1940)	
Zsolt Bor (born 1949)	Bolyai Prize laureate scientist; member of the Hungarian Academy of Sciences; Department of Optics and Quantum Electronics; one of inventors of the Rhinolight phototherapeutical apparatus (hay fever therapy)	MSc, PhD, D.Sc; professor	
Mohammad Sharif Chattar (1935–2007)	Pakistani botanist and forester	won a scholarship and went to Hungary for higher studies; obtained a PhD in botany from the university	
Sándor Csörgő (1947–2008)	highly cited researcher of mathematics; probability and mathematical statistics, asymptotic theory; member of the Hungarian Academy of Sciences	professor	
Gábor Fodor (1915–2000)		obtained a PhD, summa cum laude, in organic chemistry, physical chemistry and mineralogy at the university (1937); demonstrator (1935–1938); associate professor (1945–1950); professor of organic chemistry (1950–1957); received the Diamond Diploma in honor of the 60th anniversary of the receipt of his PhD from the university	
Alfréd Haar (1885–1933)	in 1932, introduced a measure on groups, now called the Haar measure, which allows an analogue of Lebesgue integrals to be defined on locally compact topological groups; Haar wavelet	together with Frigyes Riesz, made a major mathematical centre from the university	
Attila József (1905–1937)	considered to be one of the greatest Hungarian writers of the 20th century	entered the university in 1924 to study Hungarian and French literature; was expelled from the university because of a revolutionary poem, "Tiszta szívvel" ("With a Pure Heart") – the poem was attacked by the influential professor Antal Horger	
Gyula Juhász (1883–1937)	Hungarian poet, journalist, educator	namesake of Juhász Gyula Teacher Training College	
László Kalmár (1905–1976)	considered the founding father of both logic and theoretical computer science in Hungary	professor	
Katalin Karikó (1955)	2023 Nobel Prize in Physiology or Medicine recipient, along with Drew Weissman for their research on in vitro-transcribed messenger RNA (mRNA) for protein replacement therapy.	biochemist	
Tibor Radó (1895–1965)	Hungarian mathematician; research fellow in Germany for the Rockefeller Foundation; lectured at Harvard University and the Rice Institute and the mathematics faculty of Ohio State University; published: "On the Problem of Plateau", "Subharmonic Functions", in the Bell System Technical Journal the Busy Beaver problem	received a doctorate from the university (1923)	
Frigyes Riesz (1880–1956)	his theorem, now called the Riesz-Fischer theorem, which he proved in 1907, is fundamental in the Fourier analysis of Hilbert space; Riesz representation theorem, F. and M. Riesz theorem, Riesz-Thorin theorem	in Szeged in 1922, Riesz set up the János Bolyai Mathematical Institute in a joint venture with Haar; became editor of the newly founded journal of the institute Acta Scientiarum Mathematicarum; received honorary doctorates from the university as well as the University of Budapest and the University of Paris	
Camille Sandorfy (born 1920)	Canadian quantum chemist; member of the International Academy of Quantum Molecular Science; notable for both his works in spectroscopy and theoretical chemistry; a pioneer in the molecular orbital calculations on saturated hydrocarbons and excited aromatic molecules; performed extensive works in both vibrational and electronic spectroscopy; investigated in particular the effect of hydrogen bonding on the anharmonicity of vibrations; made also applications of biological interest	received a Bachelor of Science (1943) and PhD in chemistry (1946) from the university	
Albert Szent-Györgyi (1893–1986)	biochemist; noted the anti-scorbutic activity of ascorbic acid and discovered that paprika (capsicum annuum) was a rich source of vitamin C; recipient of the Nobel Prize in Physiology or Medicine (1937) "for his discoveries in connection with the biological combustion processes, with special reference to vitamin C and the catalysis of fumaric acid"; vitamin P	made Chair of Medical Chemistry (1930); made Chair in Organic Chemistry (1935); from 1987 to 2000 the Szeged Medical University bore his name.	
Antal Szerb (1901–1945)	writer; former President of the Hungarian Literary Academy; twice awarded the Baumgarten Prize	professor of literature	
Ernő Duda (1968)	entrepreneur, co-founder of Copy General Hungary, Antikvarium.hu and Solvo Biotechnology, former vice president of the Hungarian Skeptic Society; awarded the Dénes Gábor Prize	assistant professor of business and entrepreneurship	

== See also ==
- List of Hungarian people
