= Szeged Faculty of Science and Informatics =

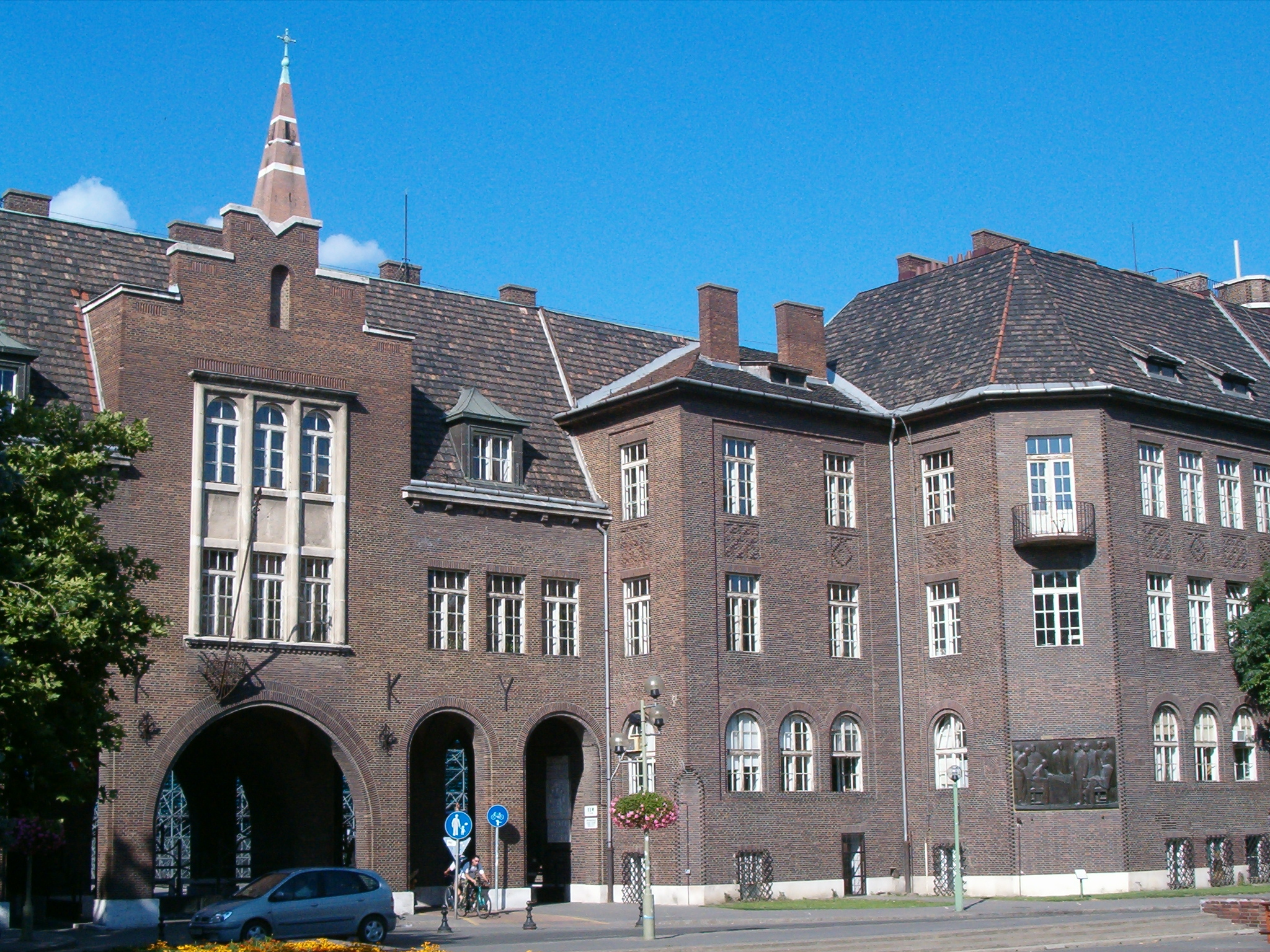
Faculty of Sciences (the chemistry building)

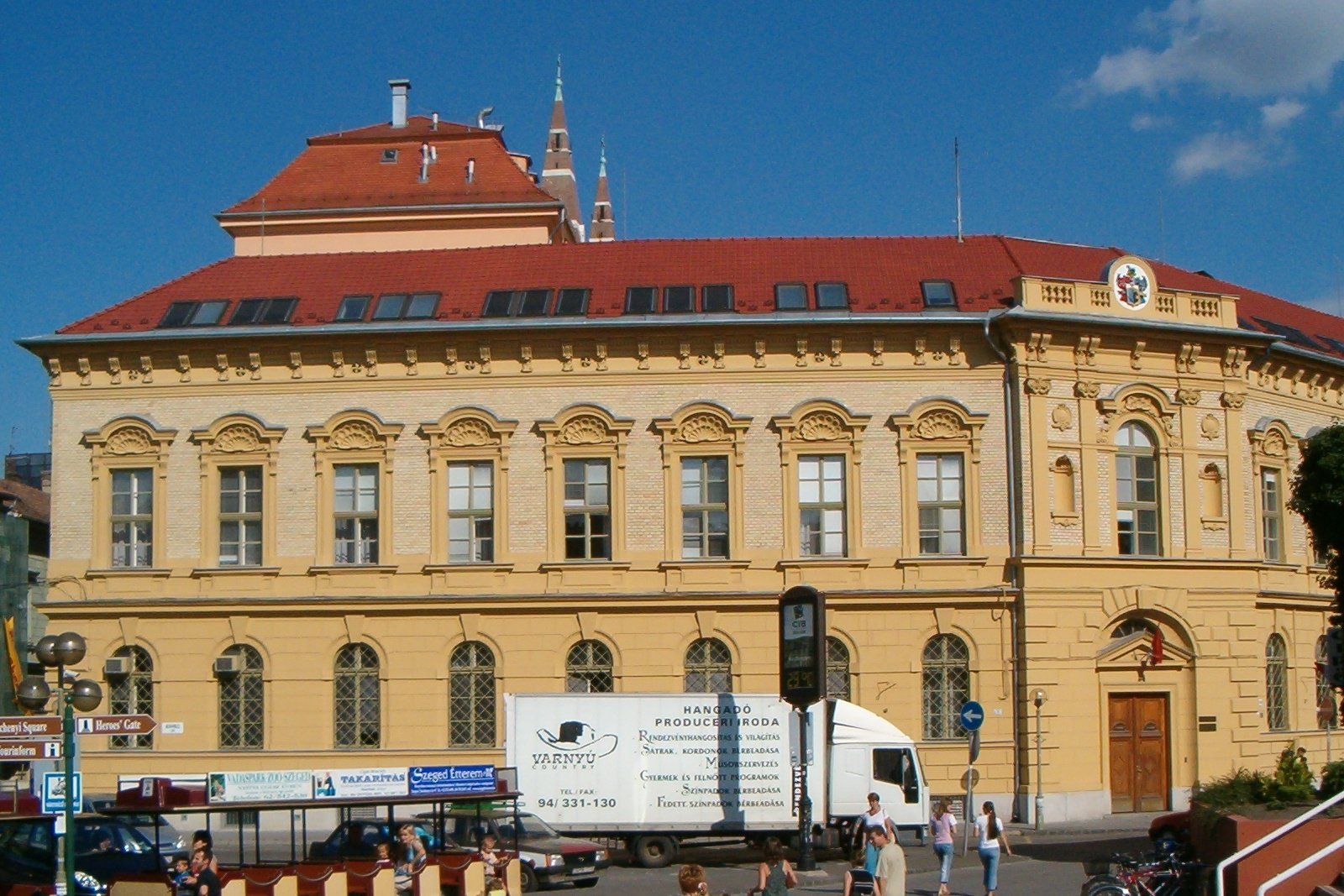
The IT Department on Árpád Square

The Faculty of Science and Informatics of the University of Szeged.

The Faculty has a student laboratory internship programme with the Pasteur Institute.

== Notable persons ==
- István Apáthy, zoology
- Zoltán Bay, physicist
- Jenő Cholnoky, geography
- Lipót Fejér, mathematics
- István Györffy, botany
- Alfréd Haar, mathematics
- László Kalmár, computer science
- Béla Kerékjártó, geometry
- László Lovász, mathematics; Wolf Prize 1999, Knuth Prize 199, Kyoto prize 2010
- Tibor Radó, mathematics
- László Rédei, mathematics
- Frigyes Riesz, mathematics
- Brúnó F. Straub, biology
- Béla Szőkefalvi-Nagy, mathematics
