= Club filter =

In mathematics, particularly in set theory, if $\kappa$ is a regular uncountable cardinal then $\operatorname{club}(\kappa),$ the filter of all sets containing a club subset of $\kappa,$ is a $\kappa$-complete filter closed under diagonal intersection called the club filter.

To see that this is a filter, note that $\kappa \in \operatorname{club}(\kappa)$ since it is thus both closed and unbounded (see club set). If $x\in\operatorname{club}(\kappa)$ then any subset of $\kappa$ containing $x$ is also in $\operatorname{club}(\kappa),$ since $x,$ and therefore anything containing it, contains a club set.

It is a $\kappa$-complete filter because the intersection of fewer than $\kappa$ club sets is a club set. To see this, suppose $\langle C_i\rangle_{i<\alpha}$ is a sequence of club sets where $\alpha < \kappa.$ Obviously $C = \bigcap C_i$ is closed, since any sequence which appears in $C$ appears in every $C_i,$ and therefore its limit is also in every $C_i.$ To show that it is unbounded, take some $\beta < \kappa.$ Let $\langle \beta_{1,i}\rangle$ be an increasing sequence with $\beta_{1,1} > \beta$ and $\beta_{1,i} \in C_i$ for every $i < \alpha.$ Such a sequence can be constructed, since every $C_i$ is unbounded. Since $\alpha < \kappa$ and $\kappa$ is regular, the limit of this sequence is less than $\kappa.$ We call it $\beta_2,$ and define a new sequence $\langle\beta_{2,i}\rangle$ similar to the previous sequence. We can repeat this process, getting a sequence of sequences $\langle\beta_{j,i}\rangle$ where each element of a sequence is greater than every member of the previous sequences. Then for each $i < \alpha,$ $\langle\beta_{j,i}\rangle$ is an increasing sequence contained in $C_i,$ and all these sequences have the same limit (the limit of $\langle\beta_{j,i}\rangle$). This limit is then contained in every $C_i,$ and therefore $C,$ and is greater than $\beta.$

To see that $\operatorname{club}(\kappa)$ is closed under diagonal intersection, let $\langle C_i\rangle,$ $i < \kappa$ be a sequence of club sets, and let $C = \Delta_{i<\kappa} C_i.$ To show $C$ is closed, suppose $S\subseteq \alpha < \kappa$ and $\bigcup S = \alpha.$ Then for each $\gamma \in S,$ $\gamma \in C_\beta$ for all $\beta < \gamma.$ Since each $C_\beta$ is closed, $\alpha \in C_\beta$ for all $\beta < \alpha,$ so $\alpha \in C.$ To show $C$ is unbounded, let $\alpha < \kappa,$ and define a sequence $\xi_i,$ $i < \omega$ as follows: $\xi_0 = \alpha,$ and $\xi_{i+1}$ is the minimal element of $\bigcap_{\gamma<\xi_i} C_\gamma$ such that $\xi_{i+1} > \xi_i.$ Such an element exists since by the above, the intersection of $\xi_i$ club sets is club. Then $\xi = \bigcup_{i<\omega} \xi_i > \alpha$ and $\xi \in C,$ since it is in each $C_i$ with $i < \xi.$

== See also ==
- Clubsuit
- Filter (mathematics) – Special subset of a partially ordered set
- Stationary set – Set-theoretic concept
