= Heinrich von Wlislocki =

Transylvanian linguist and folklorist

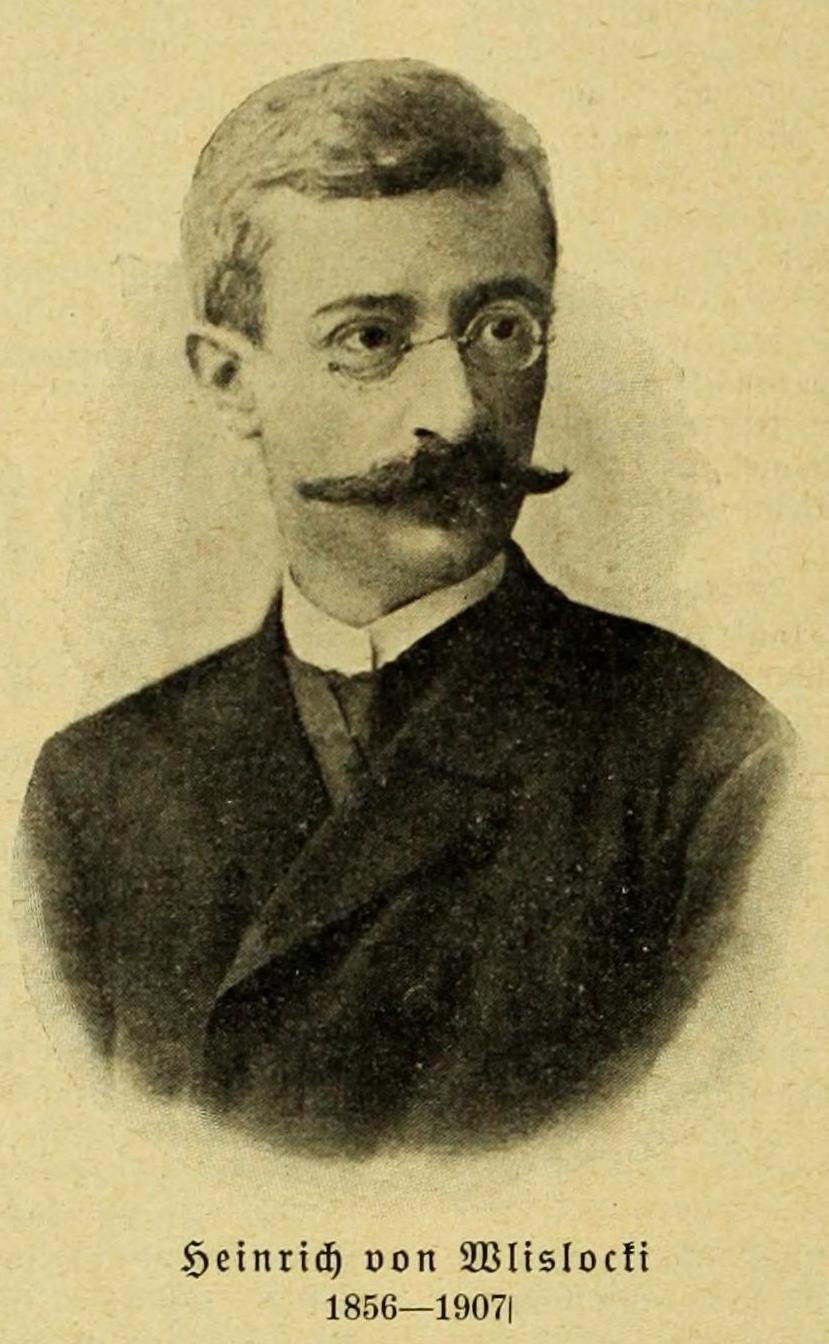
Heinrich von Wlislocki

Heinrich Adalbert von Wlislocki (Hungarian: Wlislocki Henrik; born 9 July 1856 in Kronstadt; died 19 February 1907 in Klosdorf bei Kleinkopisch, now in Șona) was a Transylvanian linguist and folklorist.

The son of an ethnically Polish Austro-Hungarian Imperial tax collector and a Transylvanian Saxon, he attended the Johannes Honterus Gymnasium in Kronstadt and then the recently founded University of Klausenburg (later Franz Joseph University) from 1875 to 1879. In 1879 he earned his doctorate with a dissertation on Eddic poetry, Hapax Legomena im Atlamál, which was published in Acta Comparationis Litterarum Universarum, a journal edited by his academic advisors, Hugo Meltzl and Sámuel Brassai. After the death of his father, he worked in humble circumstances as a private tutor. From 1883 to 1890 he lived in Mühlbach (Sebeș).

In his specialty, Romani studies, he pursued an extensive literary collection effort and engaged in field studies with nomadic Transylvanian Gypsies. He became a member of a clan and was married for a time to a Gypsy woman named Rosa Saric, from whom he was later divorced. He developed a distinguished reputation as a researcher in this area. Charles Godfrey Leland in 1889 said Wlislocki was probably more "practically familiar" with Gypsy life and language than "any scholar who ever lived."

From 1896 to 1898 he collaborated on Hans Ferdinand Helmolt's History of the World. In his last years, from 1899 to his death in 1907, he suffered from mental illness and lived under the care of his then-wife, a teacher of Hungarian named Fanny Dörfler. Dörfler was a published folkorist herself.

Wlislocki published numerous essays in periodicals, among others in the Ungarischen Revue (Hungarian Review), the Zeitschrift für vergleichende Literaturgeschichte, the Journal of the Gypsy Lore Society, the Zeitschrift für deutsche Philologie and the Zeitschrift der Deutschen Morgenländischen Gesellschaft. He also worked as a translator, translating Sandor Petőfi into Icelandic and János Vajda and "K. Szász" (per Helmolt, probably Károly Szász, 1829–1905) into German.

In 2001, the Department of Romology of the University of Pécs established the Wlislocki Henrik Roma Student College, named after Wlislocki.

== Publications ==
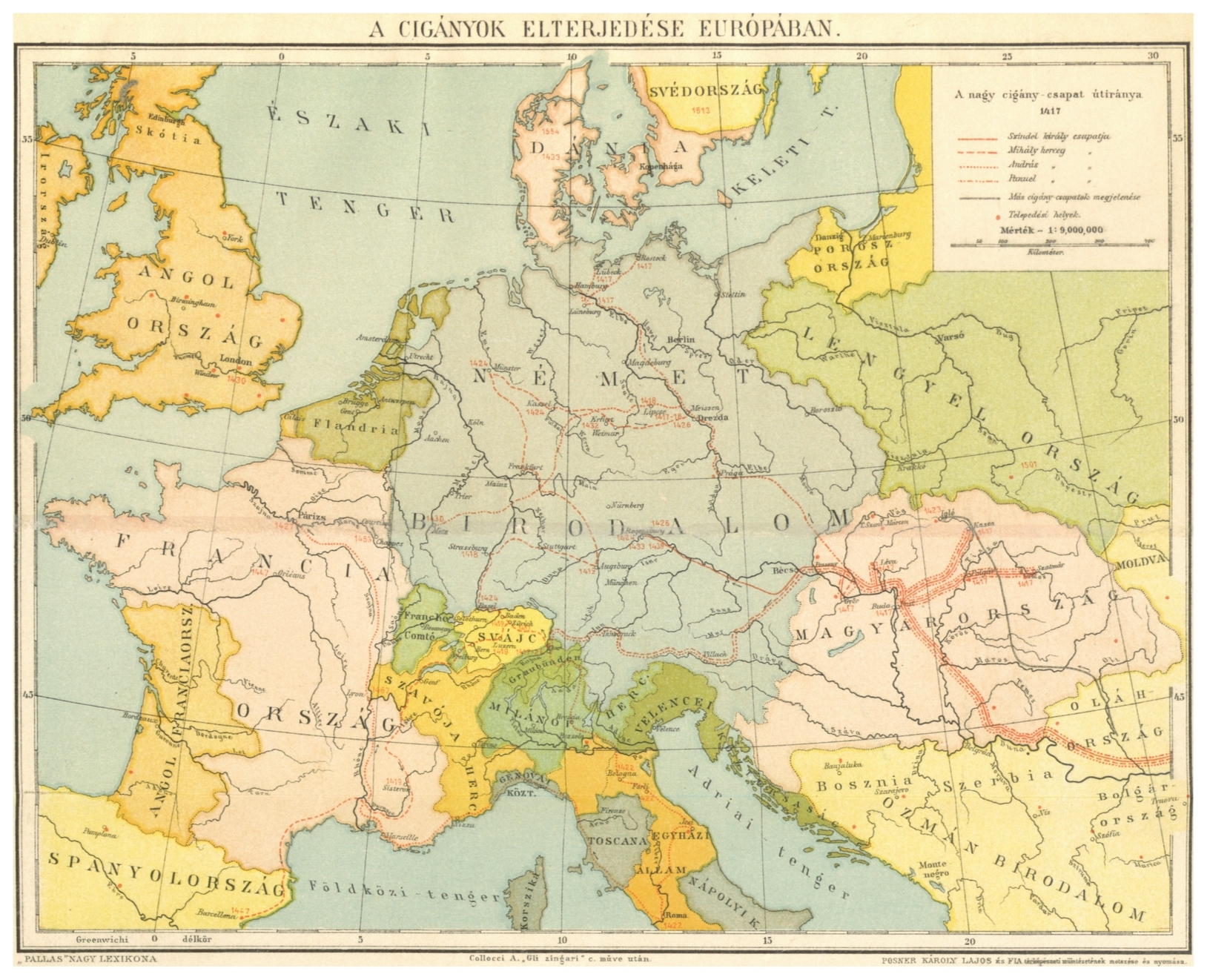
Expansion routes of the Sinti and Roma in Europe, with dates of first appearance (from an 1894 Wlislocki article)

- Haideblüten. Volkslieder der transsilvanischen Zigeuner, Leipzig: Friedrich, 1880
- Die Sprache der transsilvanischen Zigeuner. Grammatik, Wörterbuch, Leipzig: Friedrich, 1884
- Märchen und Sagen der Transsilvanischen Zigeuner, Berlin: Nicolai, 1886. online
- "Zauber- und Besprechungs-Formeln der transsilvanischen und südungarischen Zigeuner," Publicationen der ethnologischen Mitteilungen aus Ungarn, 2, Budapest: self published, 1887
- "Zur Volkskunde der transsilvanischen Zigeuner, Sammlung gemeinverständlicher wissenschaftlicher Vorträge, Neue Folge, 36, No. 2, Hamburg: Richter, 1887
- "Sitte und Brauch der Siebenbürger Sachsen," Sammlung gemeinverständlicher wissenschaftlicher Vorträge, Neue Folge, 63, Hamburg: Verlagsanstalt u. Dr., 1888
- "Aus dem Leben der Siebenbürger Rumänen," Sammlung gemeinverständlicher wissenschaftlicher Vorträge, Neue Folge, 87, No. 4, Hamburg: Verlagsanstalt u. Dr., 1889
- Volksdichtungen der siebenbürgischen und südungarischen Zigeuner, Wien: Graeser, 1890
- Vom wandernden Zigeunervolke. Bilder aus dem Leben der Siebenbürger Zigeuner. Geschichtliches, Ethnologisches, Sprache und Poesie, Hamburg: Richter, 1890
- "Die Szekler und Ungarn in Siebenbürgen," Sammlung gemeinverständlicher wissenschaftlicher Vorträge, Neue Folge, 137, No. 6, Hamburg: Verlagsanstalt u. Dr., 1891
- Märchen und Sagen der Bukowinaer und Siebenbürger Armenier, Hamburg: Verlagsanstalt u. Dr., 1891
- "Volksglaube und religiöser Brauch der Zigeuner," Darstellungen aus dem Gebiete der nichtchristlichen Religionsgeschichte, 4, Münster i. W.: Aschendorff, 1891 online
- Aus dem inneren Leben der Zigeuner, Berlin: Felber, 1892
- Volksglaube und Volksbrauch der Siebenbürger Sachsen, Berlin: Felber, 1893
- Aus dem Volksleben der Magyaren. Ethnologische Mitteilungen, München: Huttler, 1893
- "Volksglaube und religiöser Brauch der Magyaren," Darstellungen aus dem Gebiete der nichtchristlichen Religionsgeschichte, 8, Münster i. W.: Aschendorff, 1893 online
- "Zur Ethnographie der Zigeuner in Südosteuropa. Tsiganologische Aufsätze und Briefe aus dem Zeitraum 1880–1905," Studien zur Tsiganologie und Folkloristik, 12, Joachim S. Hohmann, ed., Frankfurt am Main u. a.: Lang, 1994

== Bibliography ==
- Constantin von Wurzbach: "Wlislocki, Heinrich von." In: Biographisches Lexikon des Kaiserthums Oesterreich (Biographical Lexicon of the Empire of Austria). Part 57 Kaiserlich-königliche Hof- und Staatsdruckerei, Vienna 1889, p. 183 f. (digitalised).
- Hans Ferdinand Helmolt: Ein Freund der Zigeuner, in: Das literarische Echo, 9. Jahrgang, 1. August 1907, Sp. 1632–1635 online.
- Brigitte Stephani: Vom hohen Wert der Volkspoesie. Heinrich v. Wlislocki – ein vielseitiger Erforscher siebenbürgischer Folklore. In: Volk und Kultur (Bukarest), 33/9, Sept. 1981, S. 52 ff., 2 Abb.
- Joachim S. Hohmann: Leben am Rande der Zeit. Der "Zigeunerforscher", Ethnologe und Sprachforscher Heinrich Adalbert von Wlislocki, in: Heinrich von Wlislocki: Zur Ethnographie der Zigeuner in Südosteuropa. Tsiganologische Aufsätze und Briefe aus dem Zeitraum 1880–1905 (= Studien zur Tsiganologie und Folkloristik, 12), hrsg. von Joachim S. Hohmann, Lang, Frankfurt am Main u. a. 1994, S. 9–53.
- Maria Sass: Heinrich von Wlislocki (1856–1907) – der siebenbürgische Forscher und Sammler von volksliterarischen Produktionen der Roma, in: Transilvania (Sibiu), Nr. 10, 2007, S. 35–40.
