= List of rectors of the Franz Joseph University =

The Rector of the Franz Joseph University was the university's highest officer, elected in May or June every year on the proposal of the faculties. On the same occasions the Deans were also chosen, who, together with the Pro-Rector and the Pro-Deans (the office-holders of the previous school year) formed the university council (Senate) with the Rector being its head.

The internal affairs of the institution were regulated by the Article XIX of 1872, titled "Regarding the establishment and provisional organization of the Hungarian Royal University of Kolozsvár" and accepted by the Hungarian Parliament on 12 October 1872.

== List of rectors ==
The history of the Franz Joseph University can be divided to three periods; the first one ran from the foundation (1872) until the end of the World War I, subsequently the university was forced into exile and moved its seat from Kolozsvár (Cluj-Napoca) first to Budapest (1919) and later to Szeged (1921). The Szeged-era lasted until 1940, when in accordance with the Second Vienna Award, Northern Transylvania including Kolozsvár was ceded back to Hungary and the university was relocated to its old home. In 1945, after the Soviet and Romanian forces took over the city, the Franz Joseph University ceased its operation and ended its 73 years history without legal successor. During this period, the institution had 74 rectors, including Bálint Kolosváry and Béla Reinbold, who held the position twice, and Dezső Veszprémy and Béla Issekutz who did not complete their one-year term.

=== Foundation and development period ===
- 1872–73 — Áron Berde
- 1873–74 — Vilmos Schulek, Béla Machik
- 1874–75 — Henrik Finály
- 1875–76 — Géza Entz
- 1876–77 — Gusztáv Groisz
- 1877–78 — Antal Generisch
- 1878–79 — Sándor Imre
- 1879–80 — Sámuel Brassai
- 1880–81 — Károly Haller
- 1881–82 — Sándor Ajtai K.
- 1882–83 — Károly Szabó
- 1883–84 — Antal Abt
- 1884–85 — Viktor Csiky
- 1885–86 — János Maizner
- 1886–87 — János Szamosi
- 1887–88 — Ágost Kanitz
- 1888–89 — Sándor Kolosváry
- 1889–90 — Nándor Klug
- 1890–91 — Béla Szász
- 1891–92 — Antal Koch
- 1892–93 — Kelemen Óvári
- 1893–94 — József Brandt
- 1894–95 — Hugó Meltzl
- 1895–96 — Lajos Martin
- 1896–97 — Lajos Farkas
- 1897–98 — Károly Lechner
- 1898–99 — Adolf Terner
- 1899–1900 — Rudolf Fabinyi
- 1900–01 — Gábor Vályi
- 1901–02 — József Lőte
- 1902–03 — Lajos Schilling
- 1903–04 — István Apáthy
- 1904–05 — Mór Kiss
- 1905–06 — Dénes Szabó
- 1906–07 — Gergely Moldován
- 1907–08 — Gyula Farkas
- 1908–09 — György Jancsó
- 1909–10 — László Udránszky
- 1910–11 — Lajos Szádeczky-Kardoss
- 1911–12 — Gyula Szádeczky-Kardoss
- 1912–13 — Ignác Kosutány
- 1913–14 — Balázs Kenyeres
- 1914–15 — Sándor Márki
- 1915–16 — Károly Tangl
- 1916–17 — Adolf Lukáts
- 1917–18 — Gusztáv Rigler
- 1918–19 — István Schneller

=== In exile ===
- 1919–20 — Bálint Kolosváry
- 1920–21 — Bálint Kolosváry
- 1921–22 — Gáspár Menyhárt
- 1922–23 — Péter Pfeiffer
- 1923–24 — Dezső Veszprémy, Béla Reinbold
- 1924–25 — János Csengery
- 1925–26 — Frigyes Riesz
- 1926–27 — Károly Tóth
- 1927–28 — Béla Reinbold, Béla Issekutz
- 1928–29 — Lajos Dézsi
- 1929–30 — István Győrffy
- 1930–31 — Ferenc Kováts
- 1931–32 — Elemér Veress
- 1932–33 — Henrik Schmidt
- 1933–34 — Tibor Széki
- 1934–35 — Albert Kiss
- 1935–36 — Gábor Ditrói
- 1936–37 — László Gyula Erdélyi
- 1937–38 — József Gelei
- 1938–39 — István Ereky
- 1939–40 — József Baló

=== Final years ===
- 1940–41 — György Bartók
- 1941–42 — Zsigmond Szentpétery
- 1942–43 — Béla Kovrig
- 1943–44 — László Buza
- 1944–45 — Dezső Miskolczy

== Notes ==
- Gaal, György (2001). Egyetem a Farkas utcában. Kolozsvár: Erdélyi Magyar Műszaki Tudományos Társaság. ISBN 973-0-02284-4.
