= Géza Fodor (mathematician) =

Hungarian mathematician (1927–1977)

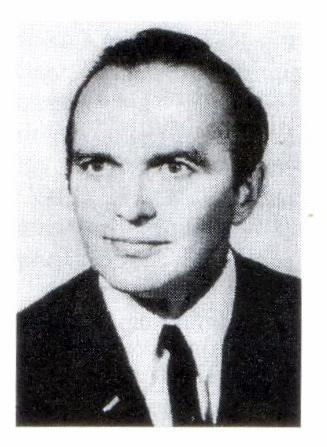
Géza Fodor

Géza Fodor (6 May 1927 in Szeged – 28 September 1977 in Szeged) was a Hungarian mathematician, working in set theory. He received a PhD from the Hungarian Academy of Sciences in 1954, advised by László Kalmár and Paul Erdős. His dissertation was titled " Investigation of the structure of set mappings".

He proved Fodor's lemma on stationary sets, one of the most important, and most used results in set theory. He was a professor at the Bolyai Institute of Mathematics at the Szeged University. He was vice-president, then president of the Szeged University. He was elected a corresponding member of the Hungarian Academy of Sciences.
