= Franz Joseph University (disambiguation) =

Franz Joseph University may refer to:

- Franz Joseph Hungarian Royal University, founded in 1872, a former university in Kolozsvár, Austro-Hungarian Empire (nowadays Cluj-Napoca, Romania)
- Royal University of Franz Joseph I, founded in 1874 in Zagreb, Austro-Hungarian Empire, nowadays University of Zagreb, Croatia
- Franz Josephs Universität, founded in 1875 in Czernowitz, Austro-Hungarian Empire, nowadays Chernivtsi University, Ukraine
