= Gyula Pap (mathematician) =

Hungarian mathematician

Gyula Pap (born 12 May 1954 in Debrecen, Hungary; died 4 October 2019) was a Hungarian mathematician and university professor at the Bolyai Institute of the University of Szeged. Pap was an expert in the field of probability theory.

== Life ==
Pap was born on 12 May 1954 in Debrecen. He attended the Mihály Fazekas High School and began studying mathematics at the University of Debrecen in 1972. He wrote his master's thesis in the field of stochastics under the supervision of Béla Gyires and graduated in 1977. In 1981, he began his doctoral studies at the Vilnius University in Lithuania under Vygantas I. Paulauskas, a leading expert in the field of stochastics in Banach spaces at the time. He received his PhD in 1985 with a dissertation titled Properties of Functions of the Distribution of the Norm of Stable Vectors in Banach Spaces.

=== At the University of Debrecen ===
In 1986, Pap became an assistant professor at the University of Debrecen. In 1989, he was appointed associate professor, and after receiving his doctorate from the Hungarian Academy of Sciences, he was promoted to full professor in 1999.

From 1990 to 1991 and again from 2003 to 2009, he was head of the Department of Applied Mathematics and Probability Theory at the University of Debrecen. From 2003 to 2009, he was also Director of the Institute of Mathematics and Computer Science and, from 2004 to 2009, Vice Dean of the Faculty of Informatics.

=== At the Bolyai Institute of the University of Szeged ===
In 2009, he moved to Szeged and served as head of the Department of Stochastics at the Bolyai Institute of the University of Szeged from 2009 to 2017.

He was also a member of the university choir and regularly played tennis in his free time.

== Work ==
Pap published works in many areas, including stochastics in Banach spaces and probability measures on Lie groups. From the 1990s onward, he primarily worked on statistical inference for stochastic processes, including time series, discrete and continuous branching processes, and stochastic differential equations.

He authored over 140 scientific papers and one monograph. He supervised 12 PhD students.

=== Selected publications ===
- With Mercedes Arriojas, Yaozhong Hu, and Salah-Eldin Mohammed: A Delayed Black and Scholes Formula (2007), Stochastic Analysis and Applications, 25:2, 471–492, doi:10.1080/07362990601139669
- With M. Ispány and M. Van Zuijlen: Fluctuation limit of branching processes with immigration and estimation of the means (2005), Advances in Applied Probability, 37(2), 523–538. doi:10.1239/aap/1118858637
- With Mátyás Barczy and Zenghu Li: Stochastic differential equation with jumps for multi-type continuous state and continuous time branching processes with immigration (2015), ALEA, Latin American Journal of Probability and Mathematical Statistics, 12(1), 129–169, arXiv:1403.0245
- With Mátyás Barczy, Márton Ispány, Manuel Scotto & Maria Eduarda Silva: Innovational Outliers in INAR(1) Models (2010), Communications in Statistics – Theory and Methods, 39:18, 3343–3362, doi:10.1080/03610920903259831
- With M. Ispány and M. Van Zuijlen: Asymptotic inference for nearly unstable INAR(1) models (2003), Journal of Applied Probability, 40(3), 750–765. doi:10.1239/jap/1059060900
- With M. Barczy: Asymptotic behavior of maximum likelihood estimator for time inhomogeneous diffusion processes (2010), Journal of Statistical Planning and Inference, 140(6), 1576–1593. doi:10.1016/j.jspi.2009.12.016
- With Mátyás Barczy: α-Wiener Bridges: Singularity of Induced Measures and Sample Path Properties (2010), Stochastic Analysis and Applications, 28:3, 447–466. doi:10.1080/07362991003704985
- With M. Barczy and M. Ispány: Asymptotic behavior of unstable INAR(p) processes (2011), Stochastic Processes and their Applications, 121(3), 583–608. doi:10.1016/j.spa.2010.11.005
- With Sándor Baran and Martien C. A. van Zuijlen: Asymptotic inference for an unstable spatial AR model (2004), Statistics, 38:6, 465–482. doi:10.1080/02331880412331319297

== Awards ==
- 1985 – Gyula-Farkas Prize
- 1995 – György-Alexits Prize
- 2007 – Honorary Medal of the Faculty of Economics at the University of Debrecen
- 2013 – Pro-Talentis Prize of the University of Szeged
- 2014 – Tibor-Szele Medal of the Bolyai János Mathematical Society
- 2015 – Hungarian Academy of Sciences
- 2018 – Pro-Facultate Prize of the University of Szeged
