= Gábor Fodor =

Gábor Fodor may refer to:

- Gábor Fodor (chemist) (1915–2000), Hungarian chemist
- Gábor Fodor (politician) (born 1962), Hungarian politician
