= Gyula Pap =

Gyula Pap is a Hungarian name and might refer to:

- Gyula Pap (ethnographer) (1813–1870), a Hungarian ethnographer.
- Gyula Pap (mathematician) (1959–2019), a Hungarian mathematician.
