= Béla Kerékjártó =

Hungarian mathematician

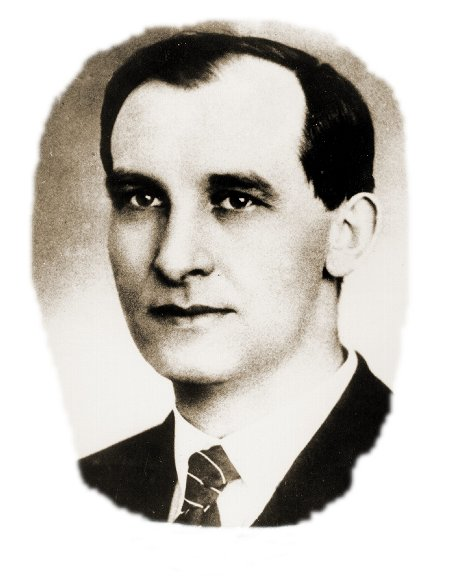
Béla Kerékjártó

Béla Kerékjártó (1 October 1898, in Budapest – 26 June 1946, in Gyöngyös) was a Hungarian mathematician who wrote numerous articles on topology.

Kerékjártó earned his Ph.D. degree from the University of Budapest in 1920. He taught at the Faculty of Sciences of the University of Szeged starting in 1922. In 1921 he introduced his program with a talk "On topological fundamentals of analysis and geometry" where he advocated that "complex analysis should be built with instruments of topology without metric elements such as length and area."

== Life and career ==
In 1923, Kerékjártó published one of the first books on Topology, which was reviewed by Solomon Lefschetz in 1925. Hermann Weyl wrote that this book completely changed his views of the subject.

In 1919 he published a theorem on periodic homeomorphisms of the disc and the sphere. A claim to priority to the result was made by L. E. J. Brouwer, and the subject was revisited by Samuel Eilenberg in 1934. A modern treatment of Kerékjártó's theorem has been presented by Adrian Constantin and Boris Kolev.

Kerékjártó was appointed head of the Department of Geometry and Descriptive Geometry at the János Bolyai Mathematical Institute of the University of Szeged in 1925.

In 1938 he returned to Budapest to teach at Eötvös Loránd University.

Kerékjártó proved that the sphere is the only compact surface that admits a 3-transitive topological group in 1941.

== Books ==
- 1923: Vorlesungen über Topologie Bd.1 Flächentopologie, Grundlehren der mathematischen Wissenschaften, Springer Verlag
- 1955: Les Fondements de la Géométrie. Bd.1. La construction élémentaire de la géométrie euclidienne, Gauthier-Villars.
- 1966: Les Fondaments de la Géométrie Bd.2, Geometrie projective, Gauthiers-Villars.

== Articles ==
- 1919: "A torus periodikus transformitioirol", Math. Term. tad. Értesitiö 39:213–9.
- 1930: "Geometrische Theorie der zweigliedrigen kontinuierlichen Gruppen", Abhandlungen aus dem Mathematischen Seminar der Universität Hamburg 8:107–14.
- 1934: "Sur la character topologique des representationes conformes", Comptes rendus 198:317–20.
- 1934: "Über reguläre Abbildungen von Flächen auf sich", Acta Scientiarum Mathematicarum 7:65–85 & 206.
- 1934: "Topologische Characterisierung der linearen Abbildungen", Acta Scientiarum Mathematicarum 6:235–62, esp. 250.
- 1940: "Sur les inversions dans un groupe commutative", Comptes rendus 210:288.
- 1940: "Sur le group des homographies et des antihomographies d’une variable complexe", Commentarii Mathematici Helvetici 13:68–82.
- 1941: "Sur les groups compact de transformations topologique des surfaces", Acta Mathematica 74:129–73.
