= Fodor's lemma =

Concept in mathematical set theory

In mathematics, particularly in set theory, Fodor's lemma (or the pressing-down lemma) states:

Fodor's lemma—If $\kappa$ is a regular, uncountable cardinal, $S$ is a stationary subset of $\kappa$, and $f:S\rightarrow\kappa$ is regressive (that is, $f(\alpha)<\alpha$ for any $\alpha\in S$, $\alpha\neq 0$) then there is some $\gamma$ and some stationary $S_0\subseteq S$ such that $f(\alpha)=\gamma$ for any $\alpha\in S_0$.

In modern parlance, the nonstationary ideal is normal. The lemma was first proved by the Hungarian set theorist, Géza Fodor in 1956.

Proof

We can assume that $0\notin S$ (by removing 0, if necessary). If Fodor's lemma is false, for every $\alpha<\kappa$ there is some club set $C_\alpha$ such that $C_\alpha\cap f^{-1}(\alpha)=\emptyset$. Let $C=\Delta_{\alpha<\kappa} C_\alpha$. The club sets are closed under diagonal intersection, so $C$ is also club and therefore there is some $\alpha\in S\cap C$. Then $\alpha\in C_\beta$ for each $\beta<\alpha$, and so there can be no $\beta<\alpha$ such that $\alpha\in f^{-1}(\beta)$, so $f(\alpha)\geq\alpha$, a contradiction.

There is a Fodor's lemma for trees:

Fodor's lemma for trees—For every non-special tree $T$ and regressive mapping $f:T\rightarrow T$ (that is, $f(t)<t$, with respect to the order on $T$, for every $t\in T$, $t\neq 0$), there is a non-special subtree $S\subseteq T$ on which $f$ is constant.

Fodor's lemma also holds for Thomas Jech's notion of stationary sets as well as for the general notion of stationary set.
