= Acta Universitatis Szegediensis =

Acta Universitatis Szegediensis may refer to:

- Acta Biologica Szegediensis
- Acta Climatologica
- Acta Cybernetica
- Acta Juridica et Politica
- Acta Scientiarum Mathematicarum
- Analysis Mathematica
- Electronic Journal of Qualitative Theory of Differential Equations
- Tiscia, an Ecological Journal
