= Zsolt Bor =

Hungarian physicist

Zsolt Bor (born 1949) is a Hungarian physicist, currently working at the University of Szeged. He has a BSc in electrical engineering from the Technical University in Kiev (1973), an MSc in physics (1974), and PhD in physics from JATE University (1975). He is a member of the Academia Europaea, the Hungarian Academy of Sciences, the Quantum Electronics and Optics Division of the European Physical Society, the Commission on Quantum Electronics, and Hungarian Physical Society Department of Optics and Quantum Electronics. He is one of the inventors of the Rhinolight phototherapeutical apparatus for hay fever therapy.
