= Club principle =

In mathematics, and particularly in axiomatic set theory, the club principles ♣_{S} are a family of combinatorial principles that are a weaker version of the corresponding ◊_{S}; it was introduced in 1975 by Adam Ostaszewski.

== Definition ==
For a given cardinal number $\kappa$ and a stationary set $S \subseteq \kappa$, $\clubsuit_{S}$ is the statement that there is a sequence $\left\langle A_\delta: \delta \in S\right\rangle$ such that

- every A_{δ} is a cofinal subset of δ
- for every unbounded subset $A \subseteq \kappa$, there is a $\delta$ so that $A_{\delta} \subseteq A$

$\clubsuit_{\omega_1}$ is usually written as just $\clubsuit$.

== ♣ and ◊ ==
It is clear that ◊ ⇒ ♣, and it was shown in 1975 that ♣ + CH ⇒ ◊; however, Saharon Shelah gave a proof in 1980 that there exists a model of ♣ in which CH does not hold, so ♣ and ◊ are not equivalent (since ◊ ⇒ CH).

== See also ==
- Club set
