= Dezső Csejtei =

Hungarian philosopher

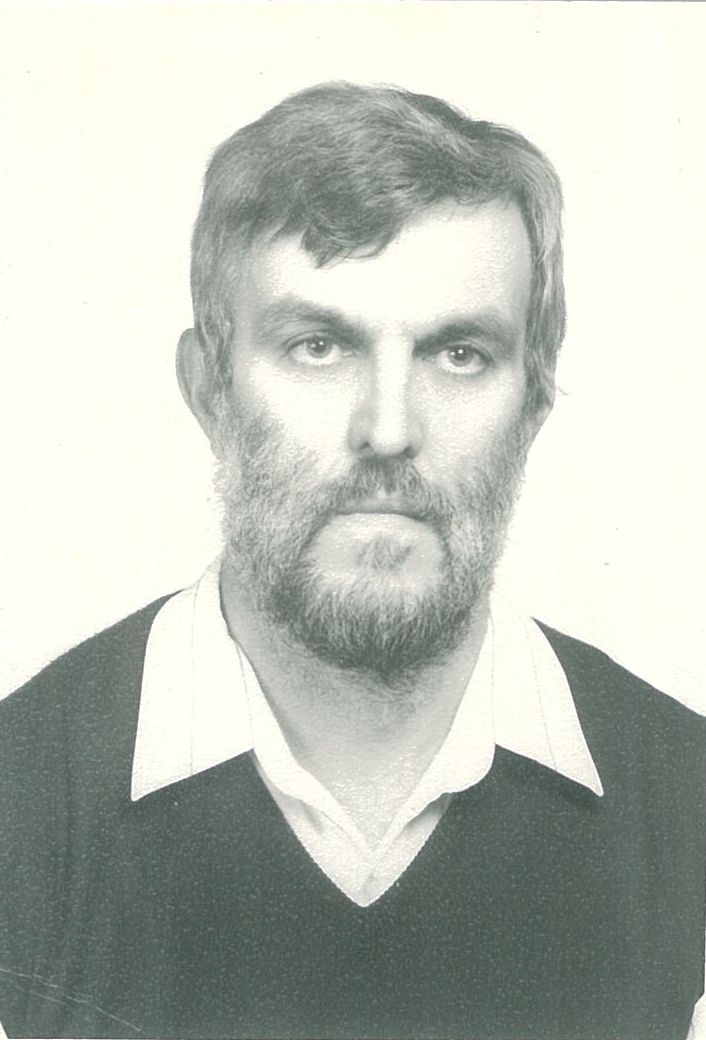
- Born: April 19, 1951 (age 75)

Philosophical work
- Era: 21st-century philosophy
- Region: Western philosophy
- School: Continental
- Institutions: University of Szeged
- Main interests: hermeneutics
- Website: http://www.csejteidezso.hu/

Dezső Csejtei (born April 19, 1951) is a Hungarian philosopher and professor of philosophy at the University of Szeged. Dezső is known for his expertise on hermeneutics, philosophy of history and theology. He is a former president of Hungarian Philosophical Society.
