= Diagonal intersection =

Diagonal intersection is a term used in mathematics, especially in set theory.

If $\displaystyle\delta$ is an ordinal number and $\displaystyle\langle X_\alpha \mid \alpha<\delta\rangle$ is a sequence of subsets of $\displaystyle\delta$, then the diagonal intersection, denoted by

$$\displaystyle\Delta_{\alpha<\delta} X_\alpha,$$

is defined to be

$$\displaystyle\{\beta<\delta\mid\beta\in \bigcap_{\alpha<\beta} X_\alpha\}.$$

That is, an ordinal $\displaystyle\beta$ is in the diagonal intersection $\displaystyle\Delta_{\alpha<\delta} X_\alpha$ if and only if it is contained in the first $\displaystyle\beta$ members of the sequence. This is the same as

$$\displaystyle\bigcap_{\alpha < \delta} ( [0, \alpha] \cup X_\alpha ),$$

where the closed interval from 0 to $\displaystyle\alpha$ is used to avoid restricting the range of the intersection.

== Relationship to the Nonstationary Ideal ==
For κ an uncountable regular cardinal, in the Boolean algebra P(κ)/I_{NS} where I_{NS} is the nonstationary ideal (the ideal dual to the club filter), the diagonal intersection of a κ-sized family of subsets of κ does not depend on the enumeration. That is to say, if one enumeration gives the diagonal intersection X_{1} and another gives X_{2}, then there is a club C so that X_{1} ∩ C = X_{2} ∩ C.

A set Y is a lower bound of F in P(κ)/I_{NS} only when for any S ∈ F there is a club C so that Y ∩ C ⊆ S. The diagonal intersection ΔF of F plays the role of greatest lower bound of F, meaning that Y is a lower bound of F if and only if there is a club C so that Y ∩ C ⊆ ΔF.

This makes the algebra P(κ)/I_{NS} a κ^{+}-complete Boolean algebra, when equipped with diagonal intersections.

== See also ==
- Club set
- Fodor's lemma
