= Gyula Vályi =

Hungarian mathematician and theoretical physicist

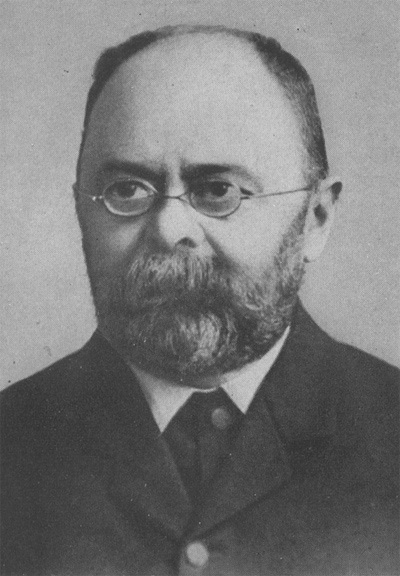
- Gyula Vályi
- Born: 25 January 1855; Neumarkt am Mieresch, Austrian Empire (today Târgu Mureș, Romania)
- Died: 13 October 1913 (aged 58); Kolozsvár, Austria-Hungary (today Cluj-Napoca, Romania)
- Education: Franz Joseph University
- Known for: mathematical analysis, geometry, number theory
- Scientific career
- Fields: Mathematics
- Workplaces: University of Kolozsvár

Gyula Vályi (25 January 1855, Neumarkt am Mieresch, Austrian Empire (now Târgu Mureş, Romania) – 13 October 1913, Kolozsvár, Austria-Hungary (now Cluj-Napoca, Romania)) was a Hungarian mathematician and theoretical physicist, a member of the Hungarian Academy of Sciences, known for his work on mathematical analysis, geometry, and number theory.

== Life and work ==
Vályi was born in Marosvásárhely, the town of the famous mathematicians Farkas Bolyai and János Bolyai. He attended the Reformed College in Marosvásárhely . After graduating from school, he went to Kolozsvár, the capital of Transylvania, where he attended the Franz Joseph University.

After qualifying as a teacher of mathematics and physics Vályi was awarded a scholarship to allow him to study for two years at the university of Berlin, where the remarkable mathematics team of Kummer, Borchardt, Weierstrass and Kronecker were lecturing.

His doctoral dissertation was on the theory of partial differential equations of the second order. His thesis was published in Kolozsvár in 1880 and can be found to this day in the library of the Faculty of Mathematics of Babeș-Bolyai University. In 1881 he became a dozent at the University of Kolozsvár. Vályi was appointed professor of theoretical physics in 1884, and in 1885 became professor of mathematics lecturing on analysis, geometry and number theory. One of his favorite courses was concerned with János Bolyai's "Appendix". He was elected a corresponding member of the Hungarian Academy of Sciences in 1891.

He retired in 1911 because of his deteriorating eyesight. After Vályi retired he went to live with his brother Gábor (1844–1926), who was a professor of statistics at the same university, also retired by this time. Since 2007 this house has possessed a commemorative plaque in Romanian and one in Hungarian stating that this was the last dwelling of Gyula Vályi.
