= Franz Joseph University =

Austro-Hungarian university

Royal Hungarian Franz Joseph University
- Magyar Királyi Ferenc József Tudományegyetem
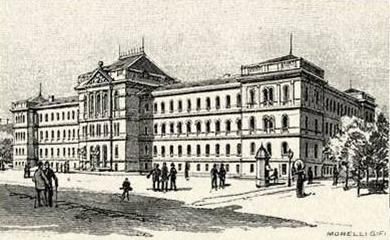
- Franz Joseph University, c.1900
- Former names: Royal Hungarian University of Kolozsvár; Magyar Királyi Kolozsvári Tudományegyetem
- Active: 1872–1945
- Location: Kolozsvár (1872–1919, 1940–1945); Budapest (1919–1921); Szeged (1921–1940)

Royal Hungarian Franz Joseph University (Hungarian: Magyar Királyi Ferenc József Tudományegyetem) was the second modern university in the Hungarian realm of the Austro-Hungarian Empire. Founded in 1872, its seat was initially in Kolozsvár (Cluj-Napoca). After World War I, it first moved to Budapest for a brief period (1919–21), and later found temporary housing in Szeged (1921–40). In 1940, after the Second Vienna Award ceded Northern Transylvania, including Kolozsvár to Hungary, the university was relocated to its old home. By the end of the World War II the territory went back to Romania, subsequently the Romanian authorities replaced the Franz Joseph University with a new Hungarian language institution and the university ceased its operation without legal successor in 1945. Its faculties and buildings later became part of the University of Szeged, Babeș-Bolyai University, and University of Medicine and Pharmacy of Târgu Mureș.

The Franz Joseph University was an important center of science and education in the Austro-Hungarian Monarchy. It was probably best known for its leading role in mathematics, earning the name "Göttingen of the Monarchy". The university attracted mathematicians such as Gyula Farkas, Lipót Fejér, Alfréd Haar, Frigyes Riesz, Ludwig Schlesinger, Béla Szőkefalvi-Nagy and Gyula Vályi.

== History ==
=== Foundation ===
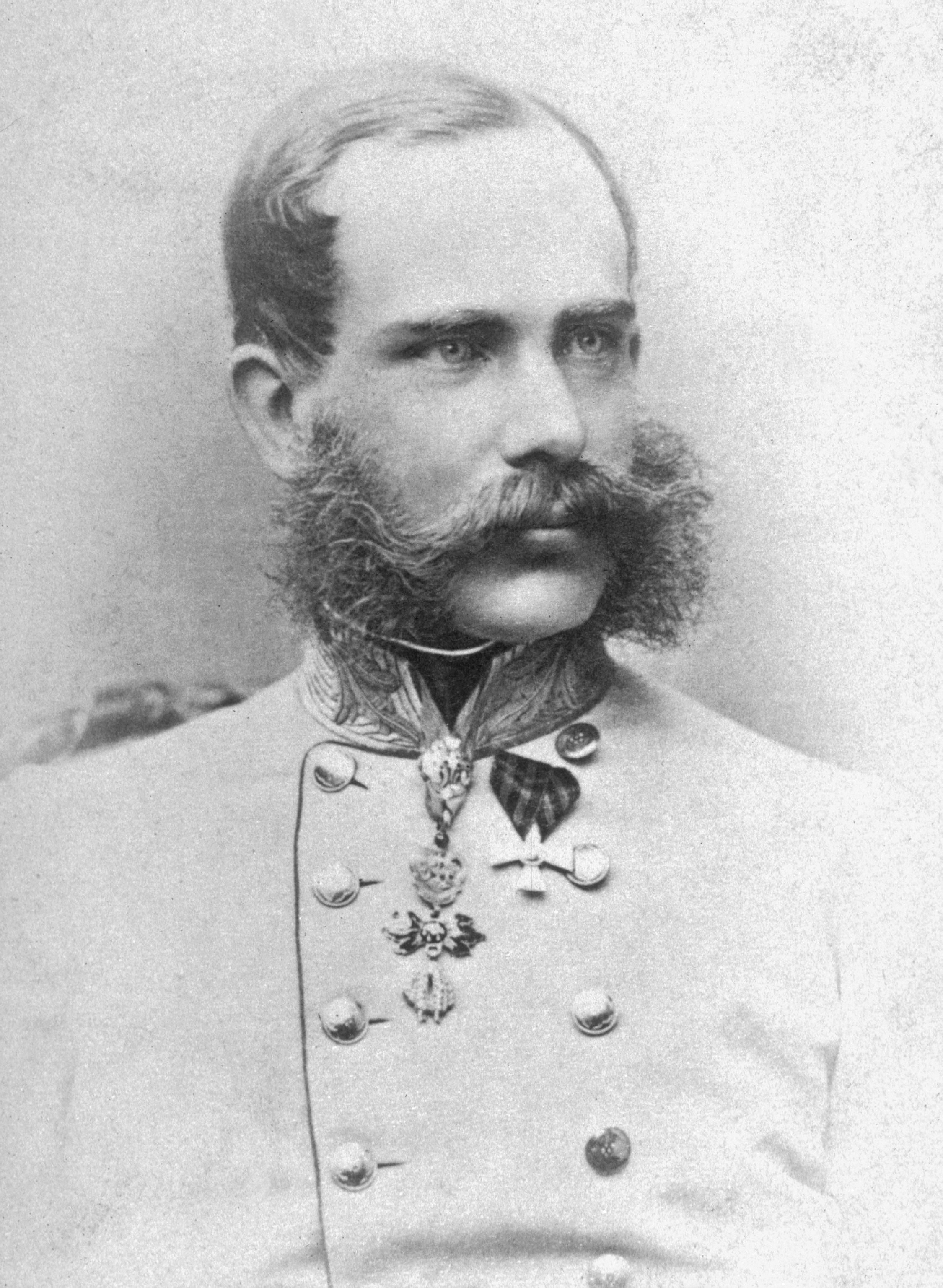
Franz Joseph, founder of the university

The university was founded five years after the Austro-Hungarian Compromise of 1867, according to which Hungary and Transylvania were reunited. It also resulted increased demands for higher education, for which Hungary, with a population over 14 million, did not have a sufficient number of institutions, especially compared to the Cisleithanian part of the monarchy with 18 million inhabitants. To manage this situation, the Hungarian government proposed to establish a new university either in Pozsony (Bratislava) or Kolozsvár, eventually choosing the latter one.

On 11 May 1870, József Eötvös, Minister of Religion and Education of Hungary presented a set of law proposals to the Hungarian Parliament regarding the reorganization of the Hungarian higher education system and the establishment of a new university in Kolozsvár. The negotiations were scheduled for January 1871, however, because of Eötvös' illness and death in early February, shortly before the decision of the parliamentary commission, the issue was postponed. It was not until 1872 when the talks continued. Considering the slow process, and the uncertain outcome of the coming elections which could have affected badly the initiations, Tivadar Pauler, Eötvös' successor turned to King Franz Joseph who authorised the Hungarian government to set up the university even before the approval of the Parliament.

Shortly after, on 11 June 1872, Prime Minister Menyhért Lónyay together with two other ministers Lajos Tisza (Transport) and Tivadar Pauler (Religion and Education) visited Kolozsvár, where they handed over the former buildings of the county council to the university and announced the availability of the teaching positions. The 39 member teaching staff was selected from over 120 applicants, on the recommendation of Ágoston Trefort, the Minister of Religion and Education of the new government; King Franz Joseph appointed the 34 ordinary and 5 extraordinary professors on 29 September and 17 October 1872, respectively. They took their oath to Ministerial Commissioner Imre Mikó on 19 October 1872 in the gala hall of the Roman Catholic Lyceum and subsequently the university authorities were formed. On the same occasion Áron Berde was elected for rector and Sámuel Brassai for prorector of the university.

Meanwhile, on 12 October 1872 the Parliament passed the draft law and enacted as the Articles XIX and XX of 1872. The first one, titled "Regarding the establishment and provisional organization of the Hungarian Royal University of Kolozsvár", arranged the organization and the internal regulations of the university, while the latter one provided the financial background of the institution. On 11 November 1872 the university effectively began its operation with 258 students on four faculties (Legal and Political Studies, Medicine, Philosophy and Sciences). Due to Magyarization policies Romanian was not included as a language of education. However, a chair for Romanian language and literature was permitted.

=== Early years and development ===
During its first decade the work in the university went under very difficult circumstances. The budget was barely enough to maintain the institution and the appropriate buildings and equipment were also missing. A process of changing in this situation began on 4 January 1881, when, after repeated requests King Franz Joseph issued the deed of foundation. He also permitted the institution to bear his name and from then it was officially known as the Royal Hungarian Franz Joseph University. In addition, this date marked the end of the temporary status of the university and the beginning of large-scale construction projects.

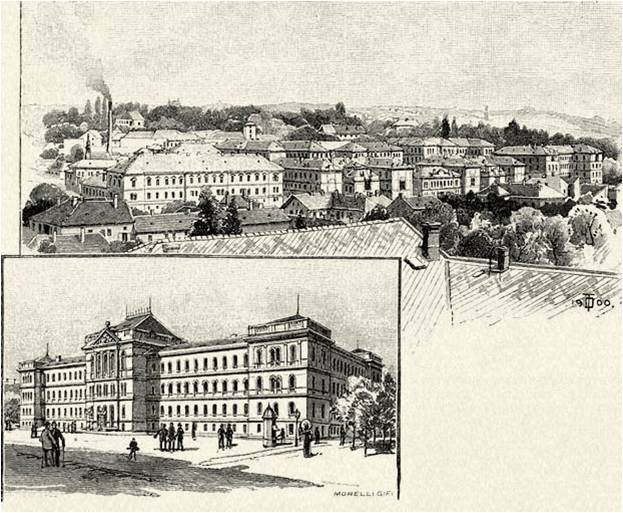
The Franz Joseph University with the view of Kolozsvár around 1900

Subsequently, a quick progression started: the number of students increased from 258 in the inaugural year to 500 in 1885 and in 1898 it exceeded the 1000 mark for the first time. Another milestone came in 1895, when women were permitted to enroll at the university in full student status. For the Hungarian Millennium (1896) the Franz Joseph University became a fully developed, internationally recognized higher education institution.

In the coming decades two factors determined the life of the university: the professionally designed buildings and the quality of the scientific workshops in them. In the 1890s the founding generation of teachers left, and a second generation occurred. While the first generation were not only chosen based on their accomplishments – many of them specialized just while teaching in the university –, the new generation had to meet strict criteria. It was almost mandatory to have a doctorate, honorary title or something above average academic work, thus the teaching staff was actually made of scientists.

The first period in the university's life ended with the school year of 1918–19, following the World War I, of which the Franz Joseph University also took its part: 3,661 students joined the forces and 193 of them died on the fronts. Additionally, the university clinics and the newly built Pasteur-building were declared military hospitals and operated with about 1,500 beds.

In the 47-year span since the foundation, the university had about 10,000 students, of which 68 got honorary doctorate and 28 laureated sub auspiciis Regis. 540 doctoral dissertations were published in print as well. 150 ordinary and extraordinary professors taught in the institution during this period, and about the same number of private professors graduated from the university, of whom more than 30 had a position in their alma mater later.

Although it was located in the mid of an ample territory inhabited by compact, Romanian-speaking population, Romanian was not used as a teaching language at this University.

=== Romanian takeover ===
In the autumn of 1918, after the collapse of Austria-Hungary and the proclamation of the union of Transylvania with Romania in the Great National Assembly of Alba Iulia on 1 December 1918, the Romanian forces began to occupy the Hungarian territories. They took the control of Kolozsvár on 24 December 1918. Initially, the Romanian authorities did not intervene to the internal affairs of the university and the education could continue. In the Romanian press, however, arguments arose about the fate of the university. Some intellectuals, including Nicolae Iorga, committed themselves to leave the Franz Joseph University as it is and proposed to establish a new Romanian university. Others argued for a gradual Romanianization of the existing university. A third group, led by Onisifor Ghibu, the former superintendent of the Transyilvanian Orthodox schools, called for instant Romanian takeover.

After gain control over Transylvania, the area was led by the Governing Council under the presidency of Iuliu Maniu, with its seat in Nagyszeben (Sibiu). Ghibu became the secretary of public education of this body and convinced the council of his point of view, including the president, who was on the moderate side at the beginning. Following the approval of the council, Ghibu organized the seizure of the buildings and equipment.

On 9 May 1919 Rector István Schneller was called upon to swear oath to King Ferdinand I and the Governing Council. He was also warned that the refusal would be considered as giving up his position and waiving from all his rights. In the case he had taken the oath, the professors had got two years to learn Romanian to maintain their position in the university. However, first the faculties and subsequently the university council rejected the oath, pleading the unclear political situation (Transylvania de jure still belonged to Hungary), the international legal norms, the autonomy of the university and their former oath to the King of Hungary.

As the negative answer arrived, on 12 May 1919, Ghibu, together with prefect Valentine Poruřiu, professor Nicolae Drăganu, accompanied by commander Ion Vasiliu went to the rector's office and proclaimed that on behalf the Governing Council they take over the university. Schneller first refused to give up the university, but at 11 am, under duress, he finally signed the handover record. The next day each department was taken over by a professional commissioner. The new Romanian university (initially named Superior Dacia University, later King Ferdinand I University) was opened on 3 November 1919, and officially inaugurated on 1–2 February 1920 in the presence of King Ferdinand I.

=== In exile ===
On 9 August 1919 it was announced that those who were not born in or were not residents of Kolozsvár before 1914 are facing a possible expulsion. Considering this, and that only a small proportion of the Hungarian students were able to speak Romanian on the level they needed to enroll at the new Romanian university, many decided to flee from the city. Those who remained were effectively expelled from mid-October 1919. In December 1919 there were already 20 university professors in Budapest. In 1920 the joint forces of the Transylvanian Hungarian churches (the Roman Catholics, the Calvinists and the Unitarians) made efforts to establish a new local Hungarian university, however, the Ministry of Cults and Instruction declared that a possible Hungarian higher education institution can be set up only in another Transylvanian town. At the same time, in June 1920 the Treaty of Trianon officially ceded Transylvania to Romania. Under these circumstances, the remaining students and professors also left Romania and moved to Budapest, joining those who fled earlier.

The city of Szeged contested for a higher education institution since the end of the 18th century. When the Franz Joseph University was left without a home, Szilveszter Somogyi mayor of Szeged appealed on 19 May 1919 to the teachers and students to come to Szeged. He offered buildings for academic institutions, student homes and 40 apartments for the professors. On 12 December 1919 the university council gave its support to the relocation plan and sent Prorector Schneller to Szeged to get informed about the further conditions. Following the visit of the delegation led by Schneller in January 1920, the council accepted the idea of moving, which eventually realized after the Treaty of Trianon irrevocably sealed the fate of Kolozsvár and the university. The Council of Ministers of Hungary decided on 1 February 1921 upon the relocation of the Franz Joseph University to Szeged. The relevant bill was presented to the parliament on 27 May 1921, which unanimously voted in favour of the proposition on 17 June. The Article XXV of 1921, published on 26 June, provided temporary housing of the university in Szeged.

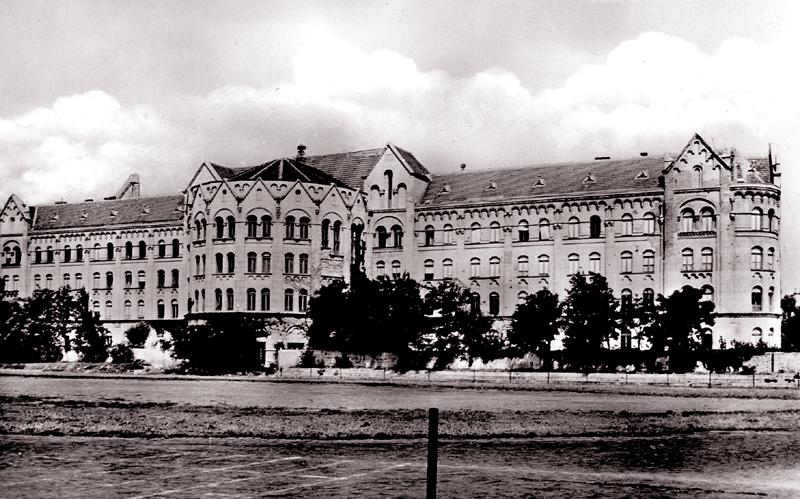
The building of the Faculty of Law around 1930 (Szeged)

The teaching staff arrived to Szeged on 22 September 1922, and with the opening ceremony on 10 October the new school year began. The Franz Joseph University continued the operation on four faculties using its earlier structure. For the first year the position of every former professors and assistant professors were reserved, however, there were some who resigned, stayed in Transylvania, got another position in Budapest or deceased. So thus, in the second year there were 44 departments led by ordinary professors and one led by extraordinary professor, supported by 25 private lecturers. In the school year 1931–32 the number of departments reached their peak with 62, but after the economical crisis it fell back to 47 in 1934–35. The complete scientific and teaching staff was around 200 people.

At the beginning, the subsidy was very low and often arrived late. Another problem was the gradual inflation and as a consequence the exponential rise of the expenditures. The university also suffered of the relatively the low number and weakly equipped buildings. An improvement of the situation started from 1922, when Kuno von Klebelsberg, Minister of Religion and Education and MP of Szeged fought out huge sums to raise buildings and get all the necessaries. The city of Szeged contributed to the project as well. When the Franz Joseph University settled in Szeged, the university did not have a library, either, as it was all left behind in Kolozsvár. The new university library in Szeged was created from private donations, and contributions of libraries and institutions of Budapest; for the end of the 1930s the library had over 250,000 volumes.

From 1928 onwards the institute offered both university and college education. The size of the students of this latter group shows a gradual increase: from the initial 75 their number grew to over 500 for the 1939–40 school year, the last the university spent in Szeged. On the other hand, the number of university students rose until 1931–32 with its maximum at 2,160, subsequently decreased to 1,084 for 1939–40. In the final year in Szeged the university had almost as many students (2,460) as in the last year before the relocation (2,570).

=== Return to Kolozsvár and dissolution ===
==== Back home ====
The Second Vienna Award, signed on 30 August 1940 in the early period of the World War II, ceded Northern Transylvania, including Kolozsvár back to Hungary. After the arbitration, the Ministry of Education of Romania decided to move the Romanian university from Kolozsvár to Sibiu and ordered to take along all the equipment and publications that are necessary to their operation. The institution was formally taken over by the Franz Jopseh University on 12 September 1940, when the keys of the main gate and the rector's office were received.

At the same time the organizational work began in Budapest. Since the relocation of the university to Szeged was only temporary, given the appropriate conditions, it was obvious to move it back to Kolozsvár. However, it needed an official framework. The new university bill was presented on 2 October 1940 and was passed two weeks later. Governor Horthy gave his signature on 18 October, and the new law was published as the Article XXVIII of 1940 on the following day. Its 11 paragraph disposed not only the reinstation of the university but also arranged to set up a fifth faculty, namely the Faculty of Economy. Simultaneously it decreed to establish the Hungarian Royal Miklós Horthy University in Szeged to replace the moving Franz Joseph University.

Governor Horthy signed the professors' commission on 19 October, who took their oath four days later, in the presence of Bálint Hóman, Minister of Religion and Education. The opening ceremony took place on 24 October 1940. The last period of the history of the Franz Joseph University lasted for five years, during which time on 85 departments over 100 professors instructed. The number of students were around 2,500 in these years, including Jews (3% of the students in 1943–44) and Romanians (4.8%). When extremist groups in October–November 1943 called for removal of the Jews from the institution, Rector László Buza ordered to aid the Jewish students and identify their abusers. Imre Haynal, Dezső Klimkó, Dezső Miskolczy, all of them being professors of medicine, also hid Jews on their clinics in the time of persecution.

==== Steadfastness in wartime ====
The war stamped especially the final two school years. The building of the Faculty of Economy was taken by the army, thus the lessons had to be held in another building. On 12 April 1944 the urgent closure of the university was ordered. On 2 June the Orthopedic Hospital of the university got a direct hit and two months later the Hungarian government commanded the rescuing of the institutes of Kolozsvár. The university archives, together with the more valuable instruments were put on trucks and were moved to the Festetics Palace in Keszthely. The bigger part of the teaching staff (about 80%) and the students fled from the prospected Soviet-Romanian occupation as well.

In such circumstances a group of Hungarian intellectuals in Kolozsvár (bishops, politicians, writers, poets) turned to Rector Dezső Miskolczy on 14 September and asked to still stay in place. Miskolczy convened the university council on the next day to discuss the issue. The council eventually decided to remain in Kolozsvár stating they can better fulfil their mission by staying with the university. The new school year opened on 17 September, subsequently Iván Rakovszky, Minister of Religion and Education of Hungary approvingly noted the determination of the university.

The Soviet troops occupied Kolozsvár without facing any resistance on 11 October 1944. Their commander, Rodion Malinovsky immediately instructed every institution to continue their operation. On the following day a group of Romanian gendarmes, students and professors from Sibiu arrived to claim back the university, which Rector Miskolczy refused. After the incidents János Demeter, the newly appointed vice-mayor of Kolozsvár applied to the Soviet commander for permission to the further operation and the ejection of the Romanians. He eventually succeed and Kolozsvár, together with whole Northern Transylvania came into an autonomous status under Soviet suzerainty until 13 March 1945, when the Romanian government gained control over the territory.

The Rector's Council called the students to enroll for the new school year between 13–18 November and the professors to return to their duty. The education began on 1 December 1944 with 15 teachers and 628 students in unheated rooms. The university clinics operated without interruption, treating about 800 patients that time. The authorities intervened to the autonomy of the university first in January 1945, when in virtue of the report of the "purging committee" 29 professors were declared to be removed from their office because of their "antidemocratic, chauvinist or fascist" behaviour. The Rector's Council stated in its response that they would like to get a specific reasoning for each of the named teachers to ensure their right to defend themselves. It was also made known that the only listed person currently in Kolozsvár is Árpád Gyergyay, who will be notified within 24 hours. The authorities dragged Gyergyay through the mire, but could not confute anything. The list was published in the press as well with purpose of discouraging the return of the listed professors.

In the meantime, Romanians of Northern Transylvania urged the introduction of the Romanian language into the university education. For its frame three possibilities came up: the Bucharest government suggested to move the Romanian university of Sibiu back to Kolozsvár with an additional Hungarian and a German department to satisfy the minority claims. Another idea was to establish a Romanian section within the Franz Joseph University. The majority of the Hungarians supported the plan of a separate Romanian-language university. After long debates and negotiations, on 9 March 1945 a University Block of three autonomous higher education institutes was proposed, including a Hungarian-language university, a Romanian-language university, and a Technical University with lessons in both languages. However, because the political change shortly after, the project never materialized.

==== Dissolution ====
On 6 March 1945 King Michael of Romania appointed Petru Groza as the new prime minister, who managed to extend the Romanian administration to Northern Transylvania starting from 13 March. Following this move, a shift in the status quo occurred, and the negotiating positions of the Hungarian university significantly worsened. A delegation of the Romanian university led by Rector Emil Petrovici arrived to Kolozsvár on 11 April and negotiation talks took place on 16–17 April. As a result, the establishment of a new Hungarian-language university was granted, however, all the buildings were expropriated by the Romanian-language university and the Hungarian institution had to move to another residence.

The decrees that adjusted the status of Hungarian-language university were published on 29 May 1945. The Decree nr. 406. disposed the move of the King Ferdinand I University back to Kolozsvár and also gave the former buildings of the Franz Joseph University to the Romanian institution. At the same time, pursuant to the Decree nr. 407. a new Hungarian-language State University was created in Kolozsvár with four faculties. This latter one got housed in the Regina Maria Lyceum, a single building replacing the university's former forty-part building complex. The exams scheduled for June were yet held, subsequently after 73 years of operation the Franz Joseph University was closed without legal successor.

=== Successors ===
The Romanian authorities did not disband the university since it might have damaged their negotiation positions in the war closing peace talks. On the other hand, they did not recognize the continuity of the Franz Joseph University, either, because it would have generated debates over the ownership of the university buildings. Thus, although officially not abolished, the Franz Joseph University ceased its operation after the spring semester of 1945.

Although had no legal successors, its buildings and equipment were received by the King Ferdinand I University, which was later renamed to Victor Babeș University. The intellectual values were carried on by the newly established Hungarian-language state university, Bolyai University, which bore the name of Transylvanian Hungarian mathematician János Bolyai. These two were forcibly merged in 1959 to create the Babeș-Bolyai University, subsequently Hungarian-language courses gradually reduced. The Hungarian community in Transylvania considered this to undermine their interests, which led to the suicide of the Hungarian pro-rector and a professor. In 1995, Babeș-Bolyai University introduced an educational system backed by the High Commissioner on National Minorities, and based on multiculturalism and multilingualism, with three lines of study (Romanian, Hungarian, and German) at all levels of academic degrees.

From the Bolyai University was separated, in 1948, the University of Medicine and Pharmacy of Târgu Mureș, that can be considered another successor. A fourth successor was the Miklós Horthy University – after the war renamed to Attila József University –, that not only inherited the buildings of the university from the Szeged period but also a number of its professors. In 1951 the Albert Szent-Györgyi Medical University seceded from the Attila József University, however, together with further higher education institutions they were amalgamated in 2000 to form the University of Szeged.

== Notable alumni ==
- Endre Bajcsy-Zsilinszky
- István Bibó
- Victor Deleu
- Emil Isac
- Attila József
- György Lukács
- Iuliu Maniu
- Béla Kun
- Hugó Meltzl
- Kálmán Mihalik
- Teodor Murăşanu
- Gyula Ortutay
- Tibor Radó
- Otto Roth
- Octavian Utalea
- Paul Devenyi
- Tivadar Soros

== See also ==
- List of rectors of the Franz Joseph University

== Sources ==
- Gaal, György (2001). Egyetem a Farkas utcában. Kolozsvár: Erdélyi Magyar Műszaki Tudományos Társaság. ISBN 973-0-02284-4. (2002, 2nd edition)
- Gaal, György (2012). Egyetem a Farkas utcában. Kolozsvár: Scientia Kiadó (3rd edition, 428 pages, with an 8-pages English abstract). ISBN 978-973-1970-70-7.
