= Acta Scientiarum Mathematicarum =

- Discipline: Mathematics
- Language: English, French, German
- Edited by: Lajos Molnár

Publication details
- History: 1922–present
- Publisher: János Bolyai Mathematical Institute, University of Szeged (Hungary)

Standard abbreviations
- ISO 4: Acta Sci. Math.
- MathSciNet: Acta Sci. Math. (Szeged)

Indexing
- ISSN: 0001-6969
- OCLC no.: 472339179

Links
- Journal homepage

Acta Scientiarum Mathematicarum is a Hungarian mathematical journal published by the János Bolyai Mathematical Institute (University of Szeged). It was established by Alfréd Haar and Frigyes Riesz in 1922. The current editor-in-chief is Lajos Molnár. The journal is abstracted and indexed in Scopus and Zentralblatt MATH.
