= Hugó Meltzl =

Hungarian academic (1846–1908)

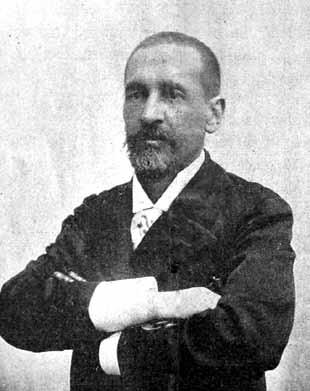
- Born: 31 July 1846; Szászrégen, Kingdom of Hungary, Habsburg Monarchy (now Reghin, Romania)
- Died: 20 January 1908 (aged 61); Nagyvárad, Transleithania, Austro-Hungarian Empire (now Oradea, Romania)
- Scientific career
- Fields: comparative literature
- Institutions: Franz Joseph University

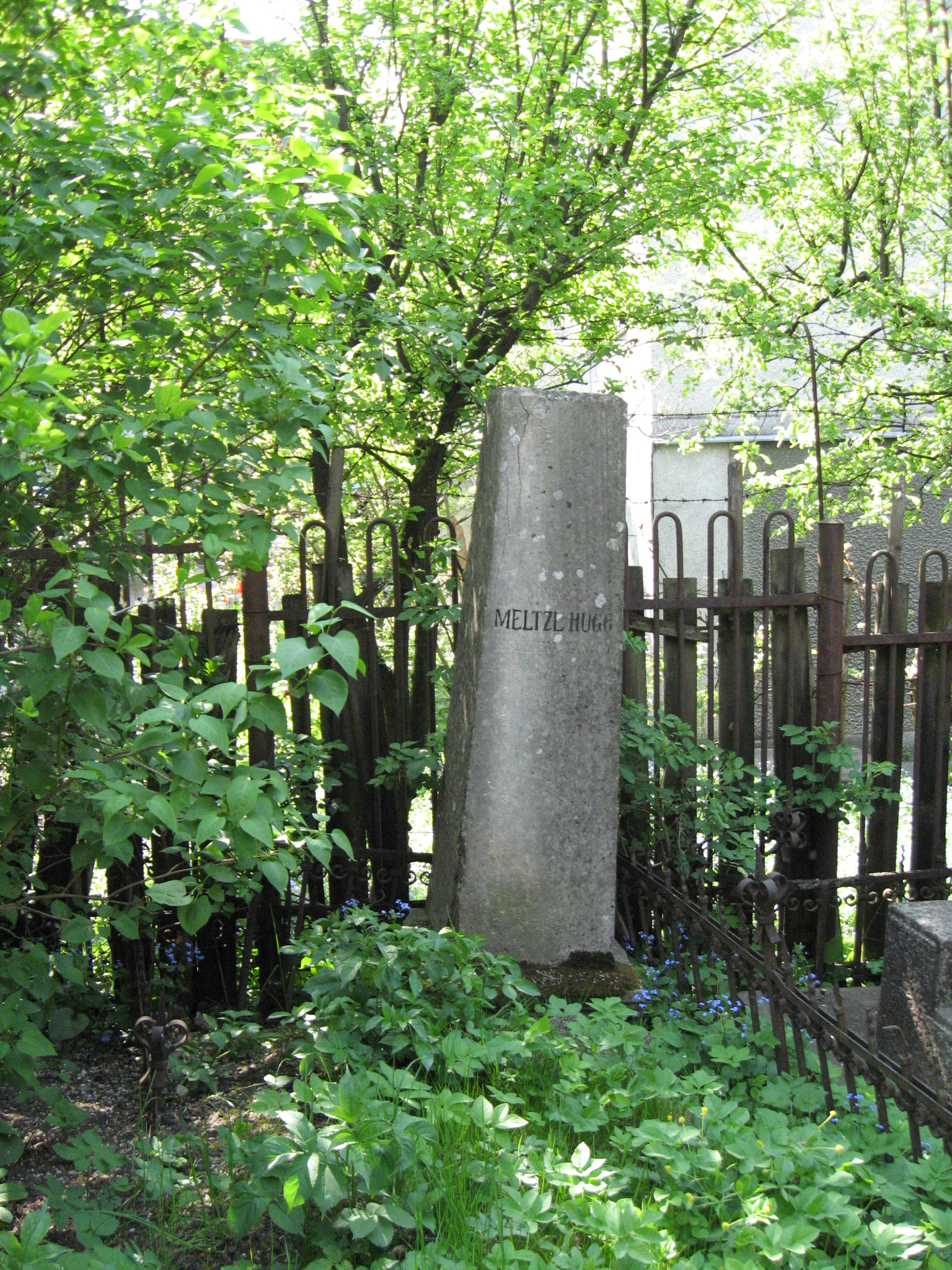
Meltzl's tomb of remembrance in the cemetery of Hajongard (Cluj-Napoca)

Hugó Meltzl von Lomnitz (31 July 1846 – 20 January 1908) was a Hungarian scholar, professor at, and later rector of, the Franz Joseph University.

== Life ==
Karl Hugo Meltzl von Lomnitz was born in Szászrégen, Hungary (now Reghin, Romania) into the German-speaking Transylvanian Saxon minority. He was the son of Samuel Traugott Meltzel von Lomnitz (1815 – 1868), a state official, and Julie Mathilde Bogner (1824 – ). He studied at the University of Kolozsvár and at the universities of Leipzig and Heidelberg in Germany. He was appointed as professor of German (later French, Italian) history and language of the newly founded Franz Joseph University. From 1880 to 1889, he was the dean of the Faculty of Philosophy, and then in 1894, he became the rector of the university. He was abroad at several times, including visiting Algeria. One of his major successes was making the works of Sándor Petőfi and József Eötvös well known in abroad.

He was an honorary member of the Freies Deutsches Hochstift of Frankfurt, the Antiquarian and Numismatic Society of Philadelphia, the American Philosophical Society (elected 1886), the Akademisch-Philosophischer Verein of Leipzig, the Royal Academy of Sciences in Palermo and of the Petőfi Institute.

Between 1877 and 1888, with Sámuel Brassai he was the co-editor and publisher of the multilingual Összehasonlító Irodalomtörténeti Lapokat (Acta Comparationis Litt. et Fontes Compar. Litt. Universarum), often quoted to be the first journal of comparative literature. As a multilingual journal, it welcomed writers from Turkey, Egypt, India and Japan, following Goethe's idea of a weltliteratur. He signed as Hugó Lomnitzi. In the second volume, he cites as his motto a quotation from a letter written by Schiller in 1789: "It would be a pitiful, petty ideal to write for one nation only: for a philosophical spirit this limitation is absolutely unbearable. This spirit could not confine itself to such a changeable, accidental, and arbitrary form of humanity, a fragment (and what else is a great nation?)".

He died on 20 January 1908 while traveling in Nagyvárad, Austria-Hungary (now Oradea, Romania), and was buried in Kolozsvár (Cluj-Napoca). He was married to Hermine Karoline Berger (1849 – 1927) from Bistriţa, and they had two daughters.

== Sources ==
- Szinnyei, József (2000), Magyar írók élete és munkái [Life and Works of Hungarian Writers] (in Hungarian), Budapest: Arcanum, ISBN 978-9638602992
- Gaal György (2001). "Egyetem a Farkas utcában: A kolozsvári Ferenc József Tudományegyetem előzményei, korszakai és vonzatai". Kolozsvár: Erdélyi Magyar Műszaki Tudományos Társaság.
- Kozma Dezső: Meltzl Hugó és a magyar irodalom (in Hungarian), Korunk 3. folyam, 20. évf. 10. sz. (2009. október) Online access
- PIM

== Further information ==
- Bányai Elemér: Meltzl Hugó (in Hungarian), Nyugat, 1908. 3. szám Online access
- T. Szabó Levente: Negotiating world literature in the first international journal of comparative literary studies. The Albanian case, Studia Universitatis Babeş-Bolyai. Philologica 2012/2, 33–52.
- T. Szabó Levente: À la recherche... de l’editeur perdu. Brassai Sámuel and the first international journal of comparative literary studies = Storia, Identita e Canoni letterari, eds. Angela Tarantino, Ioana Bot, Ayșe Saraçgil, Florence University Press, 2013, 177–188. (Biblioteca di Studi di Filologia Moderna 19.)
- T. Szabó Levente: Negotiating the borders of Hungarian national literature: the beginnings of the Acta Comparationis Litterarum Universarum and the rise of Hungarian studies (Hungarologie), Transylvanian Review 2013/1. Supplement (Mapping Literature), 47–61.
- T. Szabó Levente: Az összehasonlító irodalomtudomány kelet-európai feltalálása és beágyazottsága. Az Acta Comparationis Litterarum Universarum – egy kutatás keretei = “...hogy legyen a víznek lefolyása...” Köszöntő kötet Szilágyi N. Sándor tiszteletére, ed. Benő Attila et al., 2013, 449–460.
- T. Szabó Levente: Mit tegyünk az első nemzetközi összehasonlító irodalomtudományi lappal? Szempontok az Összehasonlító Irodalomtörténelmi Lapok (Acta Comparationis Litterarum Universarum) újraértéséhez, Literatura 2014/2, 134–147.
