= Alfréd Haar =

Hungarian mathematician

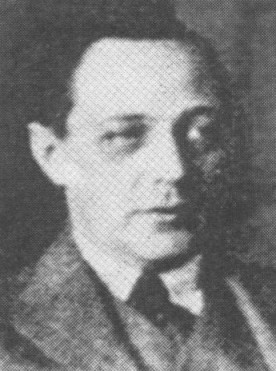
- Born: 11 October 1885; Budapest, Kingdom of Hungary
- Died: 16 March 1933 (aged 47); Szeged, Hungary
- Education: University of Göttingen
- Known for: Haar measure Haar space Haar transform Haar wavelet Haar's Tauberian theorem
- Scientific career
- Fields: Mathematics
- Workplaces: Franz Joseph University; University of Szeged
- Doctoral advisor: David Hilbert
- Doctoral students: Béla Szőkefalvi-Nagy

Alfréd Haar (Hungarian: Haar Alfréd; 11 October 1885, Budapest – 16 March 1933, Szeged) was a Hungarian mathematician. In 1904 he began to study at the University of Göttingen. His doctorate was supervised by David Hilbert. The Haar measure, Haar wavelet, and Haar transform are named in his honor. Between 1912 and 1919 he taught at Franz Joseph University in Kolozsvár (now Cluj-Napoca, Romania). Together with Frigyes Riesz, he made the University of Szeged a centre of mathematics. He also founded the Acta Scientiarum Mathematicarum journal together with Riesz.

== Biography ==
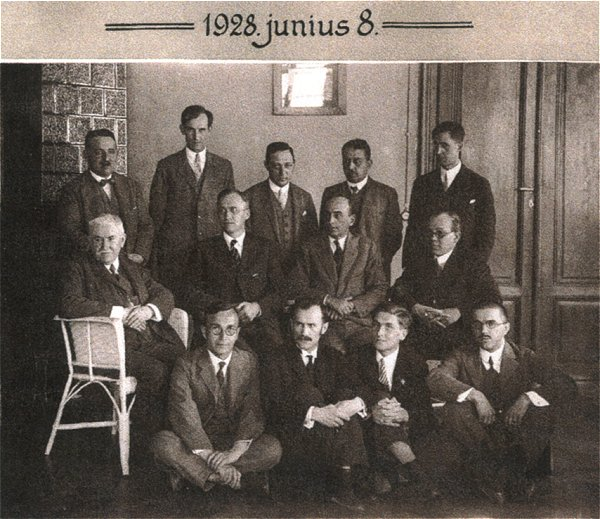
Conference at the University of Szeged, 1928. Left to right, standing: Frigyes Riesz, Béla Kerékjártó, Alfréd Haar, Gyula Kőnig, Rudolf Ortvay, on chairs: József Kürschák, George David Birkhoff, O.D. Kellog, Leopold Fejér, sitting on the floor: Tibor Radó, István Lipka, László Kalmár, Pál Szász

Haar was born to a Hungarian-Jewish family in Budapest on 11 October 1885 to parents Ignác Haar and Emma Fuchs. He graduated in 1903 from the secondary school Fasori Evangélikus Gimnázium where he was a student of László Rátz. He started his university studies in Budapest, later moving on to Göttingen reading mathematics and sciences. Among the many famous professors he was taught by, he could count Loránd Eötvös, József Kürschák, Constantin Carathéodory, David Hilbert, Felix Christian Klein and Ernst Zermelo.

During years of the secondary school, he collaborated with the mathematical journal for secondary school students Középiskolai Matematikai Lapok, and won the national Eötvös Loránd Mathematical Competition. He enrolled to the Technical University of Budapest as a student of chemical engineering, but in the same year he moved on to the University of Budapest, and after a year to the University of Göttingen. His doctoral research was supervised by Hilbert graduating in June 1909. His 49-page thesis studies systems of Sturm–Liouville functions and spherical functions, introducing the now widely used Haar orthogonal systems. In the same year he habilitated to become a private professor of the university.

In 1912, the Franz Joseph University in Kolozsvár, Austria-Hungary (now Cluj-Napoca in Romania) invited him along with Gyula Farkas and Frigyes Riesz to join as faculty, and he became the professor of 'Quatitics'. A number of his lecture notes from the time became established books later. After the Treaty of Trianon, which ceded Transylvania to Romania, the university had to move to Szeged, the closest city within the new boundaries, where he with Riesz established the Centre of Mathematics, and the first internationally recognised Hungarian mathematical journal, the Acta Scientiarum Mathematicarum.

One of his doctoral students at the University of Szeged was Béla Szőkefalvi-Nagy.

Haar died of stomach cancer on 16 March 1933.

== Fields of research ==
His results are from the fields of mathematical analysis and topological groups, in particular he researched orthogonal systems of functions, singular integrals, analytic functions, differential equations, set theory, function approximation and calculus of variations.

== Publications ==
- Haar, A., Zur Theorie der orthogonalen Funktionensysteme, (Erste Mitteilung), Math. Ann. 69 (1910), 331–371 (at GDZ). (This is Haar's thesis, written under the supervision of David Hilbert.)
- Haar, A., Die Minkowskische Geometrie und die Annäherung an stetige Funktionen, Math. Ann. 78 (1918), 294–311 (at GDZ).
