= Haar space =

In approximation theory, a Haar space or Chebyshev space is a finite-dimensional subspace $V$ of $\mathcal C(X, \mathbb K)$, where $X$ is a compact space and $\mathbb K$ either the real numbers or the complex numbers, such that for any given $f \in \mathcal C(X, \mathbb K)$ there is exactly one element of $V$ that approximates $f$ "best", i.e. with minimum distance to $f$ in supremum norm.
