= János Bolyai Mathematical Institute =

Hungarian research institute

Coordinates: 46.2472687°N 20.1476898°E

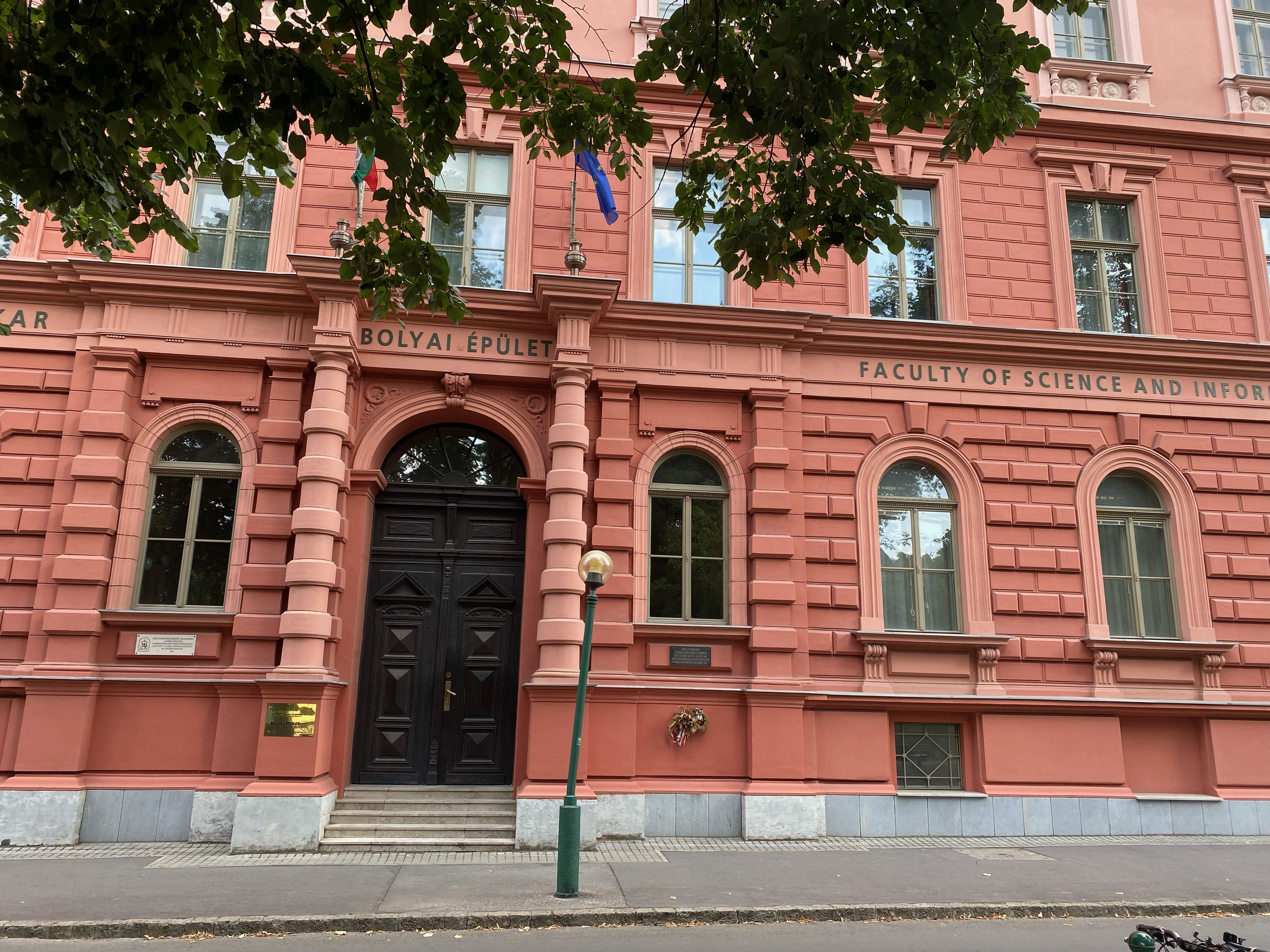
Front view of the János Bólyai Mathematical Institute

Bolyai Institute is the mathematics institute of the Faculty of Sciences of the University of Szeged, named after the Hungarian mathematicians, Farkas Bolyai, and his son János Bolyai, the co-discoverer of non-Euclidean geometry. Its director is László Zádori. Among the former members of the institute are Frigyes Riesz, Alfréd Haar, Rudolf Ortvay, Tibor Radó, Béla Szőkefalvi-Nagy, László Kalmár, Géza Fodor.

== Departments ==
- Algebra and Number Theory (head: Mária Szendrei)
- Analysis (head: Lajos Molnár)
- Applied and Numerical Mathematics (head: Tibor Krisztin)
- Geometry (head: Árpád Kurusa)
- Set Theory and Mathematical Logic (head: Péter Hajnal)
- Stochastics (head: Gyula Pap)
