= Béla Szőkefalvi-Nagy =

Hungarian mathematician

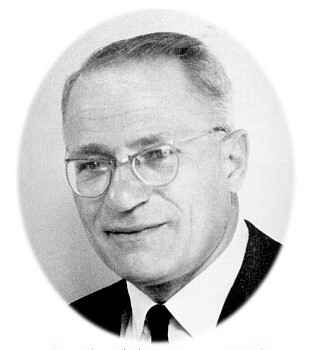
Portrait of Béla Szőkefalvi-Nagy

Béla Szőkefalvi-Nagy (Note: Hungarian pronunciation: [ˈbeːlɒ ˈsøːkɛfɒlvi ˈnɒɟ]) (29 July 1913, Kolozsvár – 21 December 1998, Szeged) was a Hungarian mathematician. His father, Gyula Szőkefalvi-Nagy was also a famed mathematician. Szőkefalvi-Nagy collaborated with Alfréd Haar and Frigyes Riesz, founders of the Szegedian school of mathematics. He contributed to the theory of Fourier series and approximation theory. His most important achievements were made in functional analysis, especially, in the theory of Hilbert space operators. He was editor-in-chief of the Zentralblatt für Mathematik, the Acta Scientiarum Mathematicarum, and the Analysis Mathematica. He was awarded the Kossuth Prize in 1953, along with his co-author F. Riesz, for his book Leçons d'analyse fonctionnelle. He was awarded the Lomonosov Medal in 1979. The Béla Szőkefalvi-Nagy Medal honoring his memory is awarded yearly by Bolyai Institute.

== His books ==
- Béla Szőkefalvi-Nagy: Spektraldarstellung linearer Transformationen des Hilbertschen Raumes.(German) Berlin, 1942. 80 p.; 1967. 82 p.
- Frederic Riesz, Béla Szőkefalvi-Nagy: Leçons d'analyse fonctionnelle. (French) 2e éd. Akadémiai Kiado, Budapest, 1953, VIII+455 pp.
- Riesz, Frederic; Sz.-Nagy, Béla (1990) [1955]. Functional Analysis. Translated by Boron, Leo F. New York: Dover Publications. ISBN 0-486-66289-6. OCLC 21228994.
- Ciprian Foiaş, Béla Szőkefalvi-Nagy: Analyse harmonique des opérateurs de l'espace de Hilbert. (French) Masson et Cie, Paris; Akadémiai Kiadó, Budapest 1967 xi+373 pp.
- Béla Szőkefalvi-Nagy, Frederic Riesz: Funkcionálanalízis. Budapest, 1988. 534 p. (English: Functional Analysis (1990). Dover. ISBN 0-486-66289-6)

== His articles ==
- Diagonalization of matrices over H^{∞}. Acta Scientiarum Mathematicarum. Szeged, 1976
- On contractions similar to isometries and Toeplitz operators, with Ciprian Foiaş. Ann. Acad. Scient. Fennicae, 1976.
- The function model of a contraction and the space L’/H’, with Ciprian Foiaş. Acta Scientiarum Mathematicarum. Szeged, 1979, 1980.
- Toeplitz type operators and hyponormality, with Ciprian Foiaş. Operator theory. Advances and appl., 1983.
- Factoring compact operator-valued functions, with authors. Acta Scientiarum Mathematicarum. Szeged, 1985.

Sz.-Nagy, Béla (1954), "Ein Satz über Parallelverschiebungen konvexer Körper", Acta Universitatis Szegediensis, 15: 169–177, MR 0065942, archived from the original on 2016-03-04, retrieved 2013-05-19.

== Award in his honour ==
In 1999, Béla Szőkefalvi-Nagy's daughter Erzsébet, established the Béla Szőkefalvi-Nagy Medal to remember her father. This medal is meant to recognize distinguished mathematicians who have published significant work in Acta Scientiarum Mathematicarum. The following mathematicians have been awarded the medal:

- C. Foiaş (2000)
- K. Tandori (2001)
- L. Leindler (2002)
- G. Grätzer (2003)
- F. Móricz (2004)
- T. Ando (2005)
- B. Csákány (2006)
- H. Bercovici (2007)
- E.T. Schmidt (2008)
- H. Langer (2009)
- P.A. Grillet (2010)
- L. Zsidó (2011)
- L. Kérchy (2012)
- V. Müller (2013)
- Z. Sebestyén (2014)
- Pei Yuan Wu (2015)
- G. Czédli (2016)
- L. Lovász (2017)
- P. Šemrl (2018)
- L. Hatvani (2019)
- F. H. Szafraniec (2020)
- L. Stachó (2021)
- Zs. Páles (2022)
- A. Böttcher (2023)
- Javad Mashreghi (2024)
- C.-K. Li (2025)

== See also ==
- Sz.-Nagy's dilation theorem
- Erdős-Nagy theorem

== To the memory of Béla Szőkefalvi-Nagy ==
- Operator theory: advances and applications. Recent advances in operator theory and related topics : the Béla Szökefalvi-Nagy memorial volume : [memorial conference held August 2–6, 1999 in Szeged] / eds. László Kérchy et al. Basel; Boston; Berlin : Birkhäuser Verlag, 2001. XLIX, 670 p. (Operator theory : advances and applications; 127.) ISBN 3-7643-6607-9
