= Club set =

Set theory concept

In mathematics, particularly in mathematical logic and set theory, a club set is a subset of a limit ordinal that is closed under the order topology, and is unbounded (see below) relative to the limit ordinal. The name club is a contraction of "closed and unbounded".

== Formal definitions ==
Formally, if $\kappa$ is a limit ordinal, then a set $C\subseteq\kappa$ is closed in $\kappa$ if and only if for every $\alpha < \kappa,$ if $\sup(C \cap \alpha) = \alpha \neq 0,$ then $\alpha \in C.$ Thus, if the limit of some sequence from $C$ is less than $\kappa,$ then the limit is also in $C.$

If $\kappa$ is a limit ordinal and $C \subseteq \kappa$ then $C$ is unbounded in $\kappa$ if for any $\alpha < \kappa,$ there is some $\beta \in C$ such that $\alpha < \beta.$

If a set is both closed and unbounded, then it is a club set.

Closed proper classes of ordinals are also of interest (every proper class of ordinals is unbounded in the class of all ordinals).

== Examples ==
The set of all countable limit ordinals is a club set with respect to the first uncountable ordinal; but it is not a club set with respect to any higher limit ordinal, since it is neither closed nor unbounded. If $\kappa$ is an uncountable initial ordinal, then the set of all limit ordinals $\alpha < \kappa$ is closed unbounded in $\kappa.$ In fact a club set is nothing else but the range of a normal function (i.e. increasing and continuous).

More generally, if $X$ is a nonempty set and $\lambda$ is a cardinal, then $C \subseteq [X]^\lambda$ (the set of subsets of $X$ of cardinality $\lambda$) is club if every union of a subset of $C$ is in $C$ and every subset of $X$ of cardinality less than $\lambda$ is contained in some element of $C$ (see stationary set).

== The closed unbounded filter ==
Let $\kappa \,$ be a limit ordinal of uncountable cofinality $\lambda .$ For some $\alpha < \lambda \,$, let $\langle C_\xi : \xi < \alpha\rangle \,$ be a sequence of closed unbounded subsets of $\kappa \,.$ Then $\textstyle\bigcap_{\xi < \alpha} C_\xi \,$ is also closed unbounded. To see this, one can note that an intersection of closed sets is always closed, so we just need to show that this intersection is unbounded. So fix any $\beta_0 < \kappa \,,$ and for each $n<\omega$ choose from each $C_\xi \,$ an element $\beta_{n+1}^\xi > \beta_{n} \,,$ which is possible because each is unbounded. Since this is a collection of fewer than $\lambda \,$ ordinals, all less than $\kappa \,,$ their least upper bound must also be less than $\kappa \,,$ so we can call it $\beta_{n+1} \,.$ This process generates a countable sequence $\beta_0,\beta_1,\beta_2, \ldots \,.$ The limit of this sequence must in fact also be the limit of the sequence $\beta_0^\xi,\beta_1^\xi,\beta_2^\xi, \ldots \,,$ and since each $C_\xi \,$ is closed and $\lambda \,$ is uncountable, this limit must be in each $C_\xi \,,$ and therefore this limit is an element of the intersection that is above $\beta_0 ,$ which shows that the intersection is unbounded.

From this, it can be seen that if $\kappa \,$ is a regular cardinal, then

$$\{S \subseteq \kappa : \exists C \subseteq S \text{ such that } C \text{ is closed unbounded in } \kappa\}$$

is a non-principal $\kappa$-complete proper filter on the set $\kappa$; that is, on the poset $(\wp(\kappa), \subseteq)$.

If $\kappa \,$ is a regular cardinal then club sets are also closed under diagonal intersection.

In fact, if $\kappa \,$ is regular and $\mathcal{F} \,$ is any filter on $\kappa \,,$ closed under diagonal intersection, containing all sets of the form $\{\xi < \kappa : \xi \geq \alpha\} \,$ for $\alpha < \kappa \,,$ then $\mathcal{F} \,$ must include all club sets.

== See also ==
- Clubsuit
- Filter (mathematics) – Special subset of a partially ordered set
- Filters in topology – Use of filters to describe and characterize all basic topological notions and results
- Stationary set – Set-theoretic concept
