= Gábor Fodor (chemist) =

Hungarian-American chemist

Gábor Béla Fodor (December 5, 1915 – November 3, 2000) was a Hungarian-American chemist, medical research scientist, and professor of chemistry. His work in academia, which spanned six decades in Europe and later in North America, specialized in research of antidotes, painkillers, tropane alkaloids, and derivatives of vitamin C. His research helped in finding treatments for cancer, strokes, Alzheimer's disease, and other illnesses.

== Early life ==
Gábor Fodor was born in Budapest. His father was Domokos Fodor, an ethnic Hungarian born in Transylvania, Romania. His mother was Paola Maria Bayer, a Roman Catholic of Jewish ancestry from Budapest. Gábor Fodor attended the University of Szeged, and he earned his Ph.D. magna cum laude. He isolated scopolamine, during his years working at the University of Szeged. He was awarded the highest recognition of Hungary, the Kossuth Prize in 1950. He later worked at Budapest's Chinoin Laboratories. Scopolamine was a highly important compound during World War II. Fodor succeeded twice in escaping imprisonment, and possible internment at a concentration camp due to his Jewish ancestry, during Nazi Germany's control of Hungary. He became part of the faculty of chemistry of the University of Szeged after World War II. He remained there as Provost until 1957, when he was forced to flee the country due to his participation in faculty and student rebellions during the Hungarian Revolution of 1956 against the Soviet domination of Hungary.

== Career ==
He received asylum in London and then in Canada. In 1964, he joined Laval University in Canada, where he taught until 1968. In 1969 he moved to the United States to accept a faculty position in the Department of Chemistry at West Virginia University. He taught for the rest of his life at West Virginia University Professor, first as Professor of Chemistry, then as a Centennial Professor of Chemistry (1969–1986); finally, as Professor Emeritus until his death on November 3, 2000. He was an active member of the university community, and one of the founders of West Virginia University's annual Benedum Lecture Series. In the year after his death, the next Benedum Lectures Series were held in his memory.

Fodor's specialized field of research concentrated on tropane alkaloids. Fodor conducted early studies of powerful drugs of this group found in natural sources. Such studies included an early configuration of cocaine, as well as early studies of its medicinal uses. Numerous studies of other compounds followed. He worked with friend and fellow countryman, Albert Szent-Györgyi (Nobel Prize in Medicine 1937), under whose direction he isolated new vitamins and derivatives. Their work connection and friendship had a profound effect on the rest of Fodor's work, especially on his successive work with Vitamin C derivatives. In the last decades of his life, he remained active in collaborations with American pharmaceutical laboratory research, scientific publications, and continued to work as a retired professor in the West Virginia University Department of Chemistry. He wrote for scientific journals in Canada and the United States.

Fodor was diagnosed with third-stage lung cancer in late 1999, and he moved to San Diego, California, for specialized treatment. He died on November 3, 2000. Posthumously, the Hungarian Academy of Sciences published his memoirs: Egy magyar kémikus élete.
