= Stationary set =

Set-theoretic concept

In mathematics, specifically set theory and model theory, a stationary set is a set that is not too small in the sense that it intersects all club sets and is analogous to a set of non-zero measure in measure theory. There are at least three closely related notions of stationary set, depending on whether one is looking at subsets of an ordinal, or subsets of something of given cardinality, or a powerset.

== Classical notion ==
If $\kappa$ is a cardinal of uncountable cofinality, $S \subseteq \kappa,$ and $S$ intersects every club set in $\kappa,$ then $S$ is called a stationary set. If a set is not stationary, then it is called a thin set. This notion should not be confused with the notion of a thin set in number theory.

If $S$ is a stationary set and $C$ is a club set, then their intersection $S \cap C$ is also stationary. This is because if $D$ is any club set, then $C \cap D$ is a club set, thus $(S \cap C) \cap D = S \cap (C \cap D)$ is nonempty. Therefore, $(S \cap C)$ must be stationary.

See also: Fodor's lemma

The restriction to uncountable cofinality is in order to avoid trivialities: Suppose $\kappa$ has countable cofinality. Then $S \subseteq \kappa$ is stationary in $\kappa$ if and only if $\kappa\setminus S$ is bounded in $\kappa$. In particular, if the cofinality of $\kappa$ is $\omega=\aleph_0$, then any two stationary subsets of $\kappa$ have stationary intersection.

This is no longer the case if the cofinality of $\kappa$ is uncountable. In fact, suppose $\kappa$ is moreover regular and $S \subseteq \kappa$ is stationary. Then $S$ can be partitioned into $\kappa$ many disjoint stationary sets. This result is due to Solovay. If $\kappa$ is a successor cardinal, this result is due to Ulam and is easily shown by means of what is called an Ulam matrix.

H. Friedman has shown that for every countable successor ordinal $\beta$, every stationary subset of $\omega_1$ contains a closed subset of order type $\beta$.

== Jech's notion ==
There is also a notion of stationary subset of $[X]^\lambda$, for $\lambda$ a cardinal and $X$ a set such that $|X|\ge\lambda$, where $[X]^\lambda$ is the set of subsets of $X$ of cardinality $\lambda$: $[X]^\lambda=\{Y\subseteq X:|Y|=\lambda\}$. This notion is due to Thomas Jech. As before, $S\subseteq[X]^\lambda$ is stationary if and only if it meets every club, where a club subset of $[X]^\lambda$ is a set unbounded under $\subseteq$ and closed under union of chains of length at most $\lambda$. These notions are in general different, although for $X = \omega_1$ and $\lambda = \aleph_0$ they coincide in the sense that $S\subseteq[\omega_1]^\omega$ is stationary if and only if $S\cap\omega_1$ is stationary in $\omega_1$.

The appropriate version of Fodor's lemma also holds for this notion.

== Generalized notion ==
There is yet a third notion, model theoretic in nature and sometimes referred to as generalized stationarity. This notion is probably due to Magidor, Foreman and Shelah and has also been used prominently by Woodin.

Now let $X$ be a nonempty set. A set $C\subseteq{\mathcal P}(X)$ is club (closed and unbounded) if and only if there is a function $F:[X]^{<\omega}\to X$ such that $C=\{z:F[[z]^{<\omega}]\subseteq z\}$. Here, $[y]^{<\omega}$ is the collection of finite subsets of $y$.

$S\subseteq{\mathcal P}(X)$ is stationary in ${\mathcal P}(X)$ if and only if it meets every club subset of ${\mathcal P}(X)$.

To see the connection with model theory, notice that if $M$ is a structure with universe $X$ in a countable language and $F$ is a Skolem function for $M$, then a stationary $S$ must contain an elementary substructure of $M$. In fact, $S\subseteq{\mathcal P}(X)$ is stationary if and only if for any such structure $M$ there is an elementary substructure of $M$ that belongs to $S$.
