= Sámuel Brassai =

Hungarian linguist and teacher

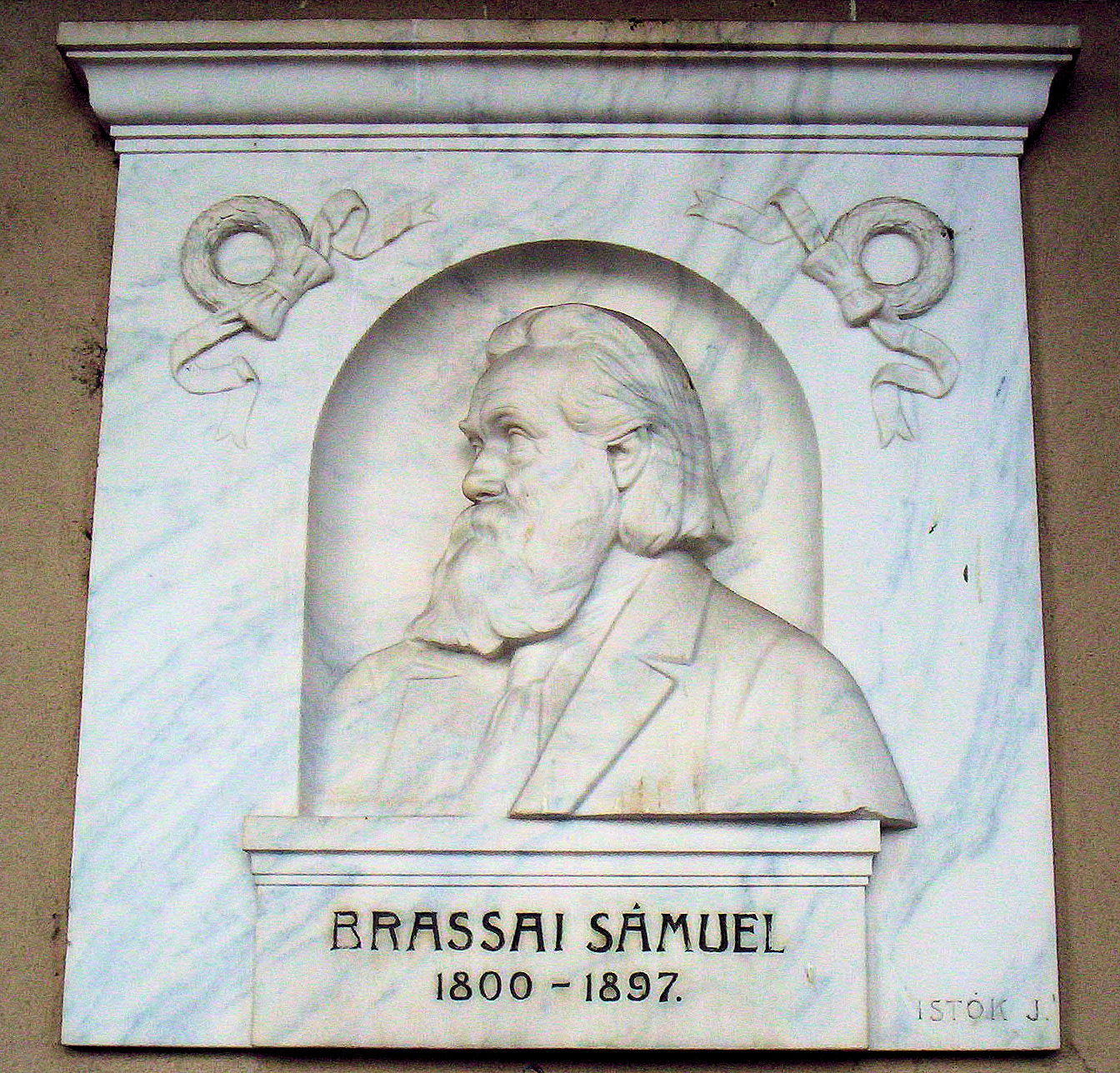
- Relief of Sámuel Brassai in Szeged
- Born: 1797 or 1800 (disputed); Torockószentgyörgy, Hungary (now Colțești, Alba, Romania)
- Died: 24 June 1897; Kolozsvár, Hungary (now Cluj-Napoca, Romania)
- Occupations: Linguist, natural scientist, mathematician, musician, philosopher

Sámuel Brassai (15 June 1797 or 1800 – 24 June 1897) was a Hungarian linguist and teacher sometimes called "The Last Transylvanian Polymath." In addition to being a linguist and pedagogue he was also a natural scientist, mathematician, musician, philosopher, essay writer, and a regular member of the Hungarian Academy of Sciences. He is perhaps best known for teaching methods.
