= University of Szeged =

University in Hungary

- Szegedi Tudományegyetem
- Seal
- Latin: Universitas Szegediensis
- Former names: Ferenc József University of Kolozsvár, József Attila Tudományegyetem
- Motto: Latin: Veritas. Virtus. Libertas
- Motto in English: Truth. Bravery. Freedom.
- Type: Public research university
- Established: 1872; 154 years ago
- Founder: Franz Joseph I
- Affiliations: European University Association, Science Without Borders, Confucius Institute
- Budget: US$220 million
- Chancellor: Judit Fendler
- Rector: László Rovó
- Academic staff: 1,968
- Administrative staff: 2,200
- Students: 22,693
- Undergraduates: 17,384
- Postgraduates: 2,668
- Doctoral students: 714
- Other students: 3,997 (international)
- Location: Szeged, Hungary; 46°15′01″N 20°08′46″E
- Campus: Urban
- Language: Hungarian, English
- Colours: Blue
- Website: www.u-szeged.hu

The University of Szeged (Hungarian: Szegedi Tudományegyetem; also abbreviated USZ) is a public research university in Szeged, Hungary. Established as the Jesuit Academy of Kolozsvár in present-day Cluj-Napoca in 1581, the institution was re-established as a university in 1872 by Emperor Franz Joseph I. The university relocated to Szeged in 1921, making it one of the oldest research universities in Hungary. It went through numerous changes throughout the 20th century and was eventually divided into distinct independent universities.

The current University of Szeged was formed in 2000 and is made up of twelve constituent faculties and nineteen doctoral schools, which consist of a range of departments and research groups. Each faculty functions autonomously. In addition to these, the university also operates the Health Centre of the University of Szeged, an extensive teaching hospital responsible for public regional healthcare, and three laboratory schools, which combine public education and teacher training responsibilities. The faculties and associated buildings do not form one single campus, as the buildings are scattered around downtown Szeged, although the Health Centre and the buildings of the Department of Arts are adjacent to each other. Being part of the Bologna zone, most majors are divided into a Bachelor's and Master's and PhD programmes, but the so-called one tyre-master (undivided) programmes are also.

The university also operates the Klebelsberg Library, the largest university library in Central Europe, and six university presses. In the fiscal year of 2014, the university had an operating budget of US$220 million. The University of Szeged has educated a large number of notable alumni, including Nobel laureates Albert Szent-Györgyi and Katalin Karikó, political scientist István Bibó, and poets Attila József and Gyula Juhász.

== History ==
=== 1581-1871: Founding and predecessors ===
The earliest predecessor of today's university was established by Stephen Báthory in the city of Kolozsvár in 1581 as a Catholic academy, with a profile in humanities and theology. The academy offered university-level education in arts and different departments were organised by 1598. Before the establishment of a full university system, the academy stopped functioning in 1605 due to the reformation and the Long Turkish War. It was eventually re-opened with Habsburg support in 1698 as the Jesuit Academy of Cluj, and was granted the title Universitas by Maria Theresa in 1753. The university was notable for educating Saxon, Romanian and Hungarian students and the university press published books in three languages.

Following the dissolution of the Society of Jesus in 1773, the university was taken over by the Piarist teaching order, who was responsible for improving modernising education: the Faculty of Law was established in 1774, with the Faculty of Medicine following in 1775. Multiple departments made up these faculties. King Joseph II downgraded the university to a Royal College of the Academy in 1784, which hindered its further progress. Still, the institution became the largest college of Transylvania. The Faculty of Theology was closed down in 1786, and the other faculties offered a wide range of education, including economics and sciences. Following the Civic Revolution and War of Independence of 1848–1849, the Faculty of Arts and Faculty of Law were closed, with the latter functioning as an independent academy starting 1863.

=== 1872-1944: University of Cluj and move to Szeged ===
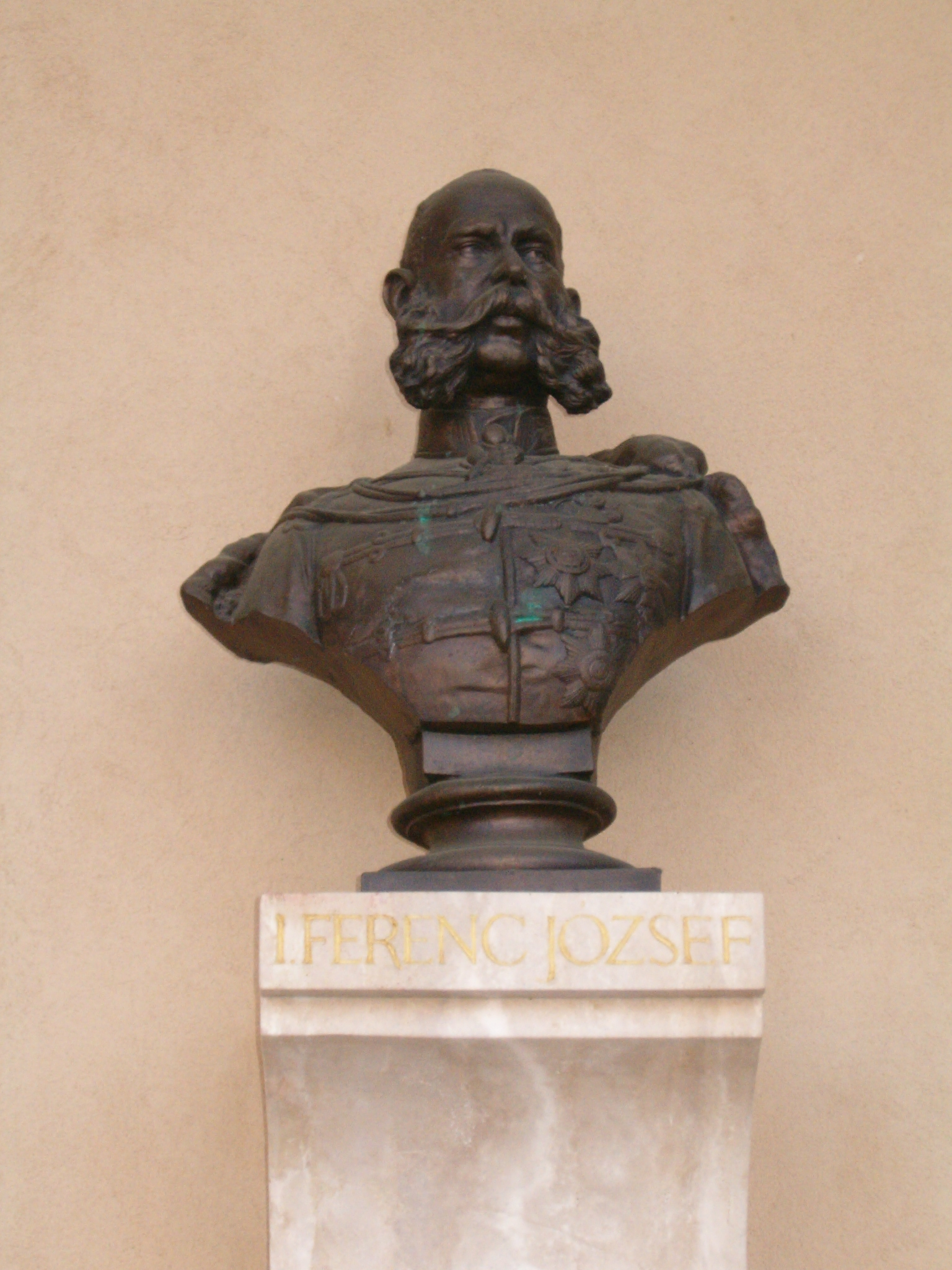
Franz Joseph, founder of the University of Cluj

The predecessor to the modern university was the University of Kolozsvár, founded in 1872 by Emperor Franz Joseph I of Austria. The university was established as a four-faculty institution following European example: the Faculty of Arts, Languages and History, the Faculty of Law and Political Sciences, the Faculty of Mathematics and Sciences, and the Faculty of Medicine were established. 269 students were enrolled in the university programmes in the first school year. The university became Ferenc József University of Cluj in 1881. Following this, the number of students grew sharply and the university had become an important centre of education at a national level. After the Unification of Transylvania with Romania in December 1918, the university was evacuated and in 1921, after the Trianon Treaty, it started to activate in Szeged. At the time, the institution had 62 functioning departments within its four faculties. Between 1922 and 1931, the university saw a great amount of development: teaching hospitals were built along the river Tisza, and other university buildings, including the research institutes on Dóm Square and the Auditorium Maximum at the Faculty of Arts, were built. Among its teachers were Albert Szent-Györgyi, one of the founders of the Faculty of Science, who received the Nobel Prize in Physiology or Medicine in 1937 for his discoveries in connection with Vitamin C.

In 1940, the university was divided into two legally separate entities: a smaller part moved back to Cluj, while the larger part remained in Szeged, and was established as a new institution under the name Miklós Horthy University.

=== 1945-1999: Separate institutions ===
Following the Soviet occupation of Szeged in October 1944, the university acquired the name University of Szeged. During this period, entrance exams were introduced and teacher training also became an important role of the institution. With the new constitution of 1949, Russian language teaching and teaching of Marxism–Leninism was introduced. Structural changes of this period include the renaming of academic titles and ranks.

In 1951, the Faculty of Medicine was separated from the other three faculties and was established as an independent institution under the name Medical University. It later acquired the name Albert Szent-Györgyi Medical University, while the other faculties assumed the name Attila József University.

=== 2000-today: University of Szeged ===
By 1996, there had been multiple institutions offering tertiary education in Szeged. As a result, the leaders of these, including those of the Attila József University, the Albert Szent-Györgyi Medical University, the Gyula Juhász Teacher Training College, and the Franz Liszt Musical College, signed a letter of intent that the Szeged University Association be established.

On 1 January 2000, the institutes were unified as the University of Szeged. Functioning as a public university, the institution comprised ten faculties, the number of which ultimately reached 12. Since 2004, a new system in tertiary education was established, which divides most majors into a Bachelor's and a Master's programme.

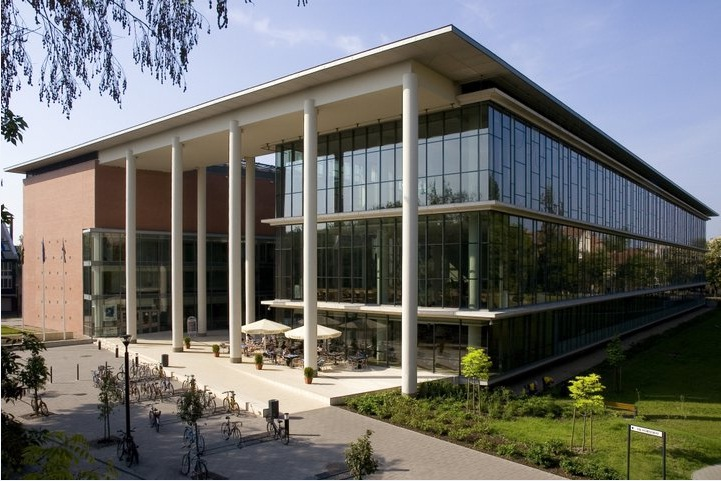
Attila József Study and Information Centre, the most recent university building

Since 2000, numerous developments have taken place. In 2004, a new university building was opened under the name Attila József Study and Information Centre. The building contains the Klebelsberg Library, the Career Centre, the Students' Service Office, and several study spaces. In 2010, the university acquired the title research university. 2014 saw the inauguration of the ELI-ALPS Research Institute, focusing on attosecond light pulse research.

In 2021, the university senate voted in favour of an operative transformation. As a result, the university will be sustained by a state-established foundation instead of operating as a public university. The decision resulted in a nationwide controversy surrounding the model change of numerous universities in Hungary.

== Campus ==
The University of Szeged has an urban campus, meaning that the university buildings are scattered throughout the city centre without comprising a continuous university campus. Nevertheless, the Health Centre bears a close resemblance to a campus, with the teaching hospitals being in one area. The main administrative building, the Rector's Office is on Dugonics Square, while the twelve faculties are housed in several buildings in downtown Szeged.

Important university buildings include the research institutes surrounding Dóm Square in a U-shape, and the Attila József Study and Information Centre on Ady Square. The building houses the Klebelsberg Library, the Career Centre, the Students' Service Office, and many study spaces. The university also has ten dormitories for Hungarian and international students. Other buildings and sites affiliated with the University of Szeged include the Biological Research Centre, the ELI-ALPS Research Institute and the Health Centre.

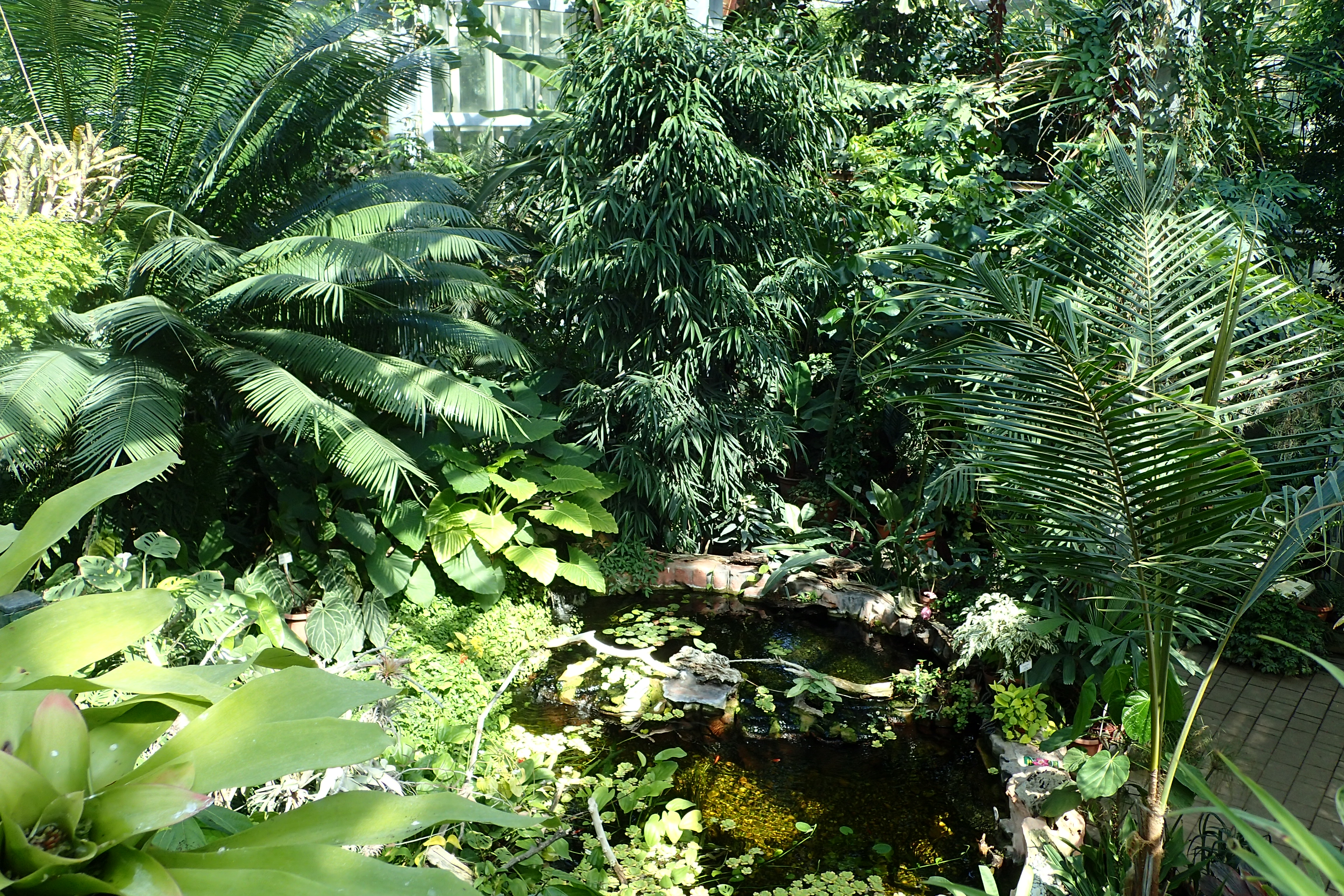
Plants in the SZTE Botanic Garden

The SZTE Botanic Garden is a 24-acre garden outside the city centre and is home to more than 40 protected species whose natural habitats are only found in Hungary. Primarily a research garden, its main purpose is to maintain its rose garden, rock garden and taxonomical collection, and to organise science lessons.

== Organisation ==
=== Central governance ===
The university's formal head is the rector, currently László Róvó. His responsibilities include maintaining in- and out-of-building relationships and making strategic decisions concerning education. Currently, there are four prorectors, responsible for strategy, education, research and development, and international relations, respectively. The chancellor is responsible for the economical management of the institution. The current chancellor is Judit Fendler. Both the chancellor and the rector are part of the Senate. Consisting of 49 decision-making delegates, the Senate make decisions on organisational changes and statutes.

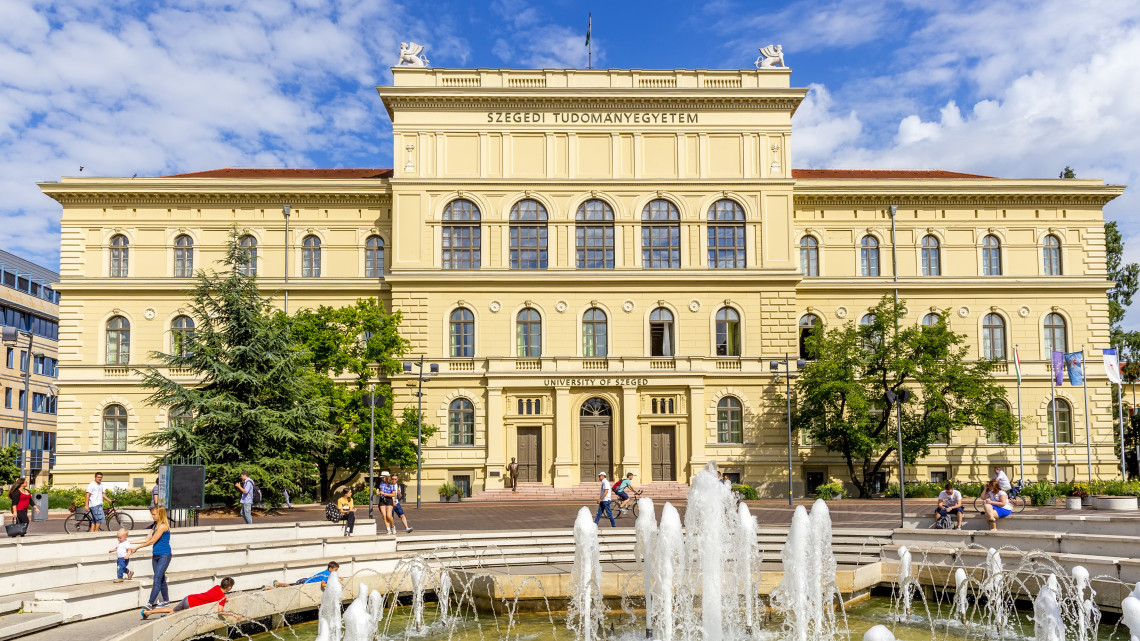
The Rector's Office on Dugonics Square

Since 2000, the institute has functioned as a public university.

=== Faculties ===
Being a collegiate university, the University of Szeged is made up of twelve constituent faculties, along with a central administration. The faculties are:

- Faculty of Agriculture – MGK
- Faculty of Health Sciences and Social Studies – ETSZK
- Faculty of Engineering – MK
- Faculty of Humanities and Social Sciences – BTK
- Faculty of Economics and Business Administration – GTK
- Faculty of Law and Political Sciences – ÁJTK
- Faculty of Medicine – ÁOK
- Béla Bartók Faculty of Arts – BBMK
- Faculty of Pharmacy – GYTK
- Faculty of Sciences and Informatics – TTIK
- Juhász Gyula Faculty of Education – JGYPK
- Faculty of Dentistry – FOK

Each faculty is led by the dean. The dean is appointed for five years and is responsible for overseeing education, research and human resources within the faculty, as well as maintaining a relationship with each department and the rector. The dean is also the leader of the Faculty Council, the decision-making body of each faculty. They are helped by a varying number of vice-deans. Each faculty consists of several institutes, usually organised according to broad research areas. These are responsible for educational decisions, courses, and research and development within the institute. The institutes are further divided into departments, which are on the smallest organisational level. They have immediate responsibility concerning courses, exams and research within the department. For interdisciplinary research involving multiple institutes or departments, research groups may be established.

== Academic profile ==
=== Research ===
The university has nineteen doctoral schools and several research groups. 14 research groups are supported by the Hungarian Academy of Sciences, among others in areas like pharmaceutical chemistry, biotechnology and environmental technology. 700 research areas are covered at the 19 doctoral schools of Szeged. The researchers of the university have had 25,000 publications in journals and conferences. They have also had 41 patents and 52 know-hows.

=== Teaching and degrees ===
Hungarian universities adopted the Bologna objectives in 2004, and as a result, most fields of study have been divided into a Bachelor's and a Master's programme. Medicine, pharmacy, and dental studies, architecture, law and teacher training programmes remain single-cycle programmes called "undivided programmes".

Undergraduate programmes usually last three to four years and result in a bachelor's degree. These usually involve earning 180 or 240 credit points and the writing of a Bachelor's thesis. Postgraduate programmes last one or two years and result in a master's degree. In many areas, distance-learning programmes are also available. Doctorate programmes are also available as an optional study course.

=== Admission ===
Tertiary education in Hungary is non-compulsory and admission is elective. The requirements for bachelor's degree programmes include taking the Matura exam, the general school-leaving exam in Hungary. In most programmes, there is an additional requirement of taking the exam in at least one subject at an advanced level. In some programmes, would-be students have to pass a practical examination or a test. Currently, the university has 21,000 university students, studying a total of 134 majors. Szeged offers 52 full-time degree programmes at Bachelor's, Master's and Doctoral level.

International students may apply for the programmes online and need to submit a form. They need to upload documents that verify their academic background, language proficiency and general health. The application process varies by faculty, and would-be students may also need to produce motivational letters or pass an online examination interview.

During the application process, would-be students receive points based on their high school performance and the results of their matura exams and may receive extra credit for outstanding performance and language certificates. Tuition is generally state-financed. Would-be students must decide whether they would like to opt for the state-financed programme, for which they need more points, or the self-financed programme. This may be changed later based on the student's academic performance.

=== Teacher education ===
Teacher education in Hungary is carried out in a 5 or 6-year, undivided study path. Would-be teachers need to choose two majors, which may or may not be taught within one faculty. The Teacher Training Centre oversees administrative duties and coordinates teacher education between the four faculties of the university that participate in their training: the Faculty of Humanities and Social Sciences, the Gyula Juhász Faculty of Education, the Faculty of Science and the Béla Bartók Faculty of Arts. Those who wish to enroll in one of the teacher training courses need to pass a general aptitude test and may need to pass practical examinations as well.

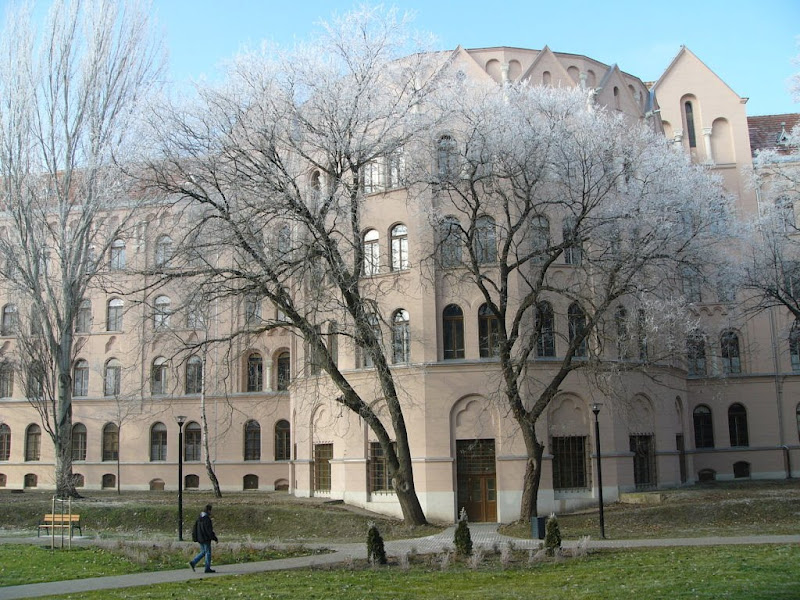
Main building of the Faculty of Humanities and Social Studies, one of the four faculties participating in teacher education

Teacher training courses range from general courses in the would-be teacher's two majors, as well as specific methodological, pedagogical and psychological modules. Would-be teachers need to pass one short-term and one long-term teaching practice in each of their two majors to receive a master's degree. A 6-year programme is available for secondary school teachers and a shorter, 5-year programme is available for primary school teachers.

Teaching practices are organised in collaboration with the university's laboratory schools. Three laboratory schools are operated by Szeged:

- SZTE István Báthory Laboratory Grammar School and Elementary School
- SZTE Gyula Juhász Elementary School
- SZTE István Vántus Vocational School of Music

These institutions function as university-affiliated state schools. Students of these schools are taught by trained teachers and student-teachers as well, and classroom observations also take place. Based on Heti Világgazdaság's annual school report, SZTE István Báthory Laboratory Grammar School and Elementary School is Hungary's 32th best high school and the best high school in Szeged based on students' competencies, language performance and university admissions.

== Astronomical Observatory ==
In 1985 the (that time called Attila József) University was gifted a 400 mm astronomical telescope, perfectly suited to the scientific needs of the time, by its partner institution in Odessa, with the aim of facilitating the launch of astronomical research in Szeged. Dr. Károly Szatmáry, the professor of the university, initiated the Szeged Astronomical Observatory Foundation in the summer of 1990, with the aim of providing a proper location for the telescope in Szeged. The foundation started collecting funds, and thanks to donations from individuals, companies and the Attila József University the Observatory was opened at July 6, 1992. For now the astronomical research of the university is done with other telescopes and the astronomical observatory is the base of the amateur astronomers of the region. The Astronomical Observatory of Szeged is located next to the SZTE Botanic Garden and is open for the public at Friday's evenings.

== Rankings ==
University rankings

Global – Overall
- QS World: =597 (2026)

Regional – Overall
- QS Emerging Europe and Central Asia: 29 (2022)

== Notable alumni and faculty ==
The University of Szeged has educated a large number of authors, scientists and athletes. Notable alumni include Nobel laureate scientist Katalin Karikó, opera singer Krisztián Cser, physicists Peter Heszler and László Bela Kish, poets Attila József, Gyula Juhász and Miklós Radnóti, author Mario Szenessy, and Olympic athletes Natasa Janics, Márton Joób and Anita Márton.

Notable professors include Nobel prize-winner Albert Szent-Györgyi, as well as Dezső Csejtei, Sándor Imre, Károly Marót, Ágoston Pável, Antal Szerb, Hildebrand Dezső Várkonyi, István Bibó, Ferenc Finkey, János Martonyi, Gábor Fodor, István Rusznyák, István Apáthy, Zoltán Bay, Lipót Fejér, Alfréd Haar, László Kalmár, Béla Kerékjártó, László Lovász, Tibor Radó, László Rédei, Frigyes Riesz, Béla Szőkefalvi-Nagy and Afwa Thameur.

== See also ==
- Open access in Hungary
- List of universities in Hungary
- List of University of Szeged people

== Bibliography ==
- János Martonyi, József Ruszoly: A JATE története – A Szegedi Tudományegyetem múltja és jelene. Szeged, 1999.
- SZTE the Greatest Community in Town 2019 brochure – Directorate for International&Public Relations
