= Carathéodory's theorem (conformal mapping) =

Theorem in complex analysis

In mathematics, Carathéodory's theorem is a theorem in complex analysis, named after Constantin Carathéodory, which extends the Riemann mapping theorem. The theorem, published by Carathéodory in 1913, states that any conformal mapping sending the unit disk to some region in the complex plane bounded by a Jordan curve extends continuously to a homeomorphism from the unit circle onto the Jordan curve. The result is one of Carathéodory's results on prime ends and the boundary behaviour of univalent holomorphic functions.

== Proofs of Carathéodory's theorem ==
The first proof of Carathéodory's theorem presented here is a summary of the short self-contained account in Garnett & Marshall (2005, pp. 14–15); there are related proofs in Pommerenke (1992) and Krantz (2006).

Carathéodory's theorem. If f maps the open unit disk D conformally onto a bounded domain U in C, then f has a continuous one-to-one extension to the closed unit disk if and only if ∂U is a Jordan curve.

Clearly if f admits an extension to a homeomorphism, then ∂U must be a Jordan curve.

Conversely if ∂U is a Jordan curve, the first step is to prove f extends continuously to the closure of D. In fact this will hold if and only if f is uniformly continuous on D: for this is true if it has a continuous extension to the closure of D; and, if f is uniformly continuous, it is easy to check f has limits on the unit circle and the same inequalities for uniform continuity hold on the closure of D.

Suppose that f is not uniformly continuous. In this case there must be an ε > 0 and a point ζ on the unit circle and sequences z_{n}, w_{n} tending to ζ with |f(z_{n}) − f(w_{n})| ≥ 2ε. This is shown below to lead to a contradiction, so that f must be uniformly continuous and hence has a continuous extension to the closure of D.

For 0 < r < 1, let γ_{r} be the curve given by the arc of the circle | z − ζ | = r lying within D. Then f $\circ$ γ_{r} is a Jordan curve. Its length can be estimated using the Cauchy–Schwarz inequality:

$$\displaystyle{\ell(f\circ \gamma_r) = \int_{\gamma_r} |f^\prime(z)|\, |dz|\le \left(\int_{\gamma_r}\,|dz|\right)^{1/2}\cdot \left(\int_{\gamma_r}|f^\prime(z)|^2\,|dz|\right)^{1/2}\le (2\pi r)^{1/2} \cdot\left(\int_{\{\theta:|\zeta +re^{i\theta}|<1\}} |f^\prime(\zeta + re^{i\theta})|^2\,r\,d\theta\right)^{1/2}.}$$

Hence there is a "length-area estimate":

$$\displaystyle{\int_0^{1} \ell(f\circ \gamma_r)^2 \, {dr\over r} \le 2\pi \int_{|z|<1} |f^\prime(z)|^2 \,dx\, dy = 2\pi \cdot {\rm Area}\,f(D)<\infty.}$$

The finiteness of the integral on the left hand side implies that there is a sequence r_{n} decreasing to 0 with $\ell(f\circ \gamma_{r_n})$ tending to 0. But the length of a curve g(t) for t in (a, b) is given by

$$\displaystyle{\ell(g) =\sup_{a< t_1< t_2 < \cdots <t_k<b}\sum_{i=1}^{k-1} |g(t_{i+1})-g(t_i)|.}$$

The finiteness of $\ell(f\circ \gamma_{r_n})$ therefore implies that the curve has limiting points a_{n}, b_{n} at its two ends with $|a_n - b_n| \le \ell(f\circ \gamma_{r_n})$, so this distance, as well that of the curve, tends to 0. These two limit points must lie on ∂U, because f is a homeomorphism between D and U and thus a sequence converging in U has to be the image under f of a sequence converging in D. By assumption there exist a homeomorphism β between the circle ∂D and ∂U. Since β^{−1} is uniformly continuous, the distance between the two points ξ_{n} and η_{n} corresponding to a_{n} and b_{n} in ∂U must tend to 0. So eventually the smallest circular arc in ∂D joining ξ_{n} and η_{n} is defined. Denote τ_{n} image of this arc under β. By uniform continuity of β, the diameter of τ_{n} in ∂U tends to 0. Together τ_{n} and f $\circ$ γ_{r_{n}} form a simple Jordan curve. Its interior U_{n} is contained in U by the Jordan curve theorem for ∂U and ∂U_{n}: to see this, notice that U is the interior of ∂U, as it is bounded, connected and it is both open and closed in the complement of ∂U; so the exterior region of ∂U is unbounded, connected and does not intersect ∂U_{n}, hence its closure is contained in the closure of the exterior of ∂U_{n}; taking complements, we get the desired inclusion. The diameter of ∂U_{n} tends to 0 because the diameters of τ_{n} and f $\circ$ γ_{r_{n}} tend to 0. Hence the diameter of U_{n} tend to 0. (For $\bar U_n \times \bar U_n$ is compact set, hence $\bar U_n$ contains two points u and v such that distance between them is maximal. It is easy to see that u and v must lie in ∂U and the diameters of both U and ∂U equal $|u-v|$.)

Now if V_{n} denotes the intersection of D with the disk |z − ζ| < r_{n}, then for all sufficiently large n f(V_{n}) = U_{n}. Indeed, the arc γ_{r_{n}} divides D into V_{n} and complementary region $V_n'$, so under the conformal homeomorphism f the curve f $\circ$ γ_{r_{n}} divides U into $f(V_n)$ and a complementary region $f(V_n')$; U_{n} is a connected component of U \ f $\circ$ γ_{r_{n}}, as it is connected and is both open and closed in this set, hence $U_n$ equals either $f(V_n)$ or $f(V_n')$. The diameter of $f(V_n')$ does not decrease with increasing n, for $n<n'$ implies $V_n' \subset V_{n'}'$. Since the diameter of U_{n} tends to 0 as n goes to infinity, it is eventually less than that of $f(V_n')$ and then necessarily f(V_{n}) = U_{n}.

So the diameter of f(V_{n}) tends to 0. On the other hand, passing to subsequences of (z_{n}) and (w_{n}) if necessary, it may be assumed that z_{n} and w_{n} both lie in V_{n}. But this gives a contradiction since |f(z_{n}) − f(w_{n})| ≥ ε. So f must be uniformly continuous on U.

Thus f extends continuously to the closure of D. Since f(D) = U, by compactness f carries the closure of D onto the closure of U and hence ∂D onto ∂U. If f is not one-one, there are points u, v on ∂D with u ≠ v and f(u) = f(v). Let X and Y be the radial lines from 0 to u and v. Then f(X ∪ Y) is a Jordan curve. Arguing as before, its interior V is contained in U and is a connected component of U \ f(X ∪ Y). On the other hand, D \ (X ∪ Y) is the disjoint union of two open sectors W_{1} and W_{2}. Hence, for one of them, W_{1} say, f(W_{1}) = V. Let Z be the portion of ∂W_{1} on the unit circle, so that Z is a closed arc and f(Z) is a subset of both ∂U and the closure of V. But their intersection is a single point and hence f is constant on Z. By the Schwarz reflection principle, f can be analytically continued by conformal reflection across the circular arc. Since non-constant holomorphic functions have isolated zeros, this forces f to be constant, a contradiction. So f is one-one and hence a homeomorphism on the closure of D.

Two different proofs of Carathéodory's theorem are described in Carathéodory (1954) and Carathéodory (1998). The first proof follows Carathéodory's original method of proof from 1913 using properties of Lebesgue measure on the circle: the continuous extension of the inverse function g of f to ∂U is justified by Fatou's theorem on the boundary behaviour of bounded harmonic functions on the unit disk. The second proof is based on the method of Lindelöf (1914), where a sharpening of the maximum modulus inequality was established for bounded holomorphic functions h defined on a bounded domain V: if a lies in V, then

|h(a)| ≤ m^{t} ⋅ M^{1 − t},

where 0 ≤ t ≤ 1, M is maximum modulus of h for sequential limits on ∂U and m is the maximum modulus of h for sequential limits on ∂U lying in a sector centred on a subtending an angle 2πt at a.

== Continuous extension and the Carathéodory-Torhorst theorem ==
An extension of the theorem states that a conformal isomorphism

$$g\colon \mathbb{D} \to U$$,

where $U$ is a simply connected subset of the Riemann sphere, extends continuously to the unit circle if and only if the boundary of $U$ is locally connected.

This result is often also attributed to Carathéodory, but was first stated and proved by Marie Torhorst in her 1918 thesis, under the supervision of Hans Hahn, using Carathéodory's theory of prime ends. More precisely, Torhorst proved that local connectivity is equivalent to the domain having only prime ends of the first kind. By the theory of prime ends, the latter property, in turn, is equivalent to $g$ having a continuous extension.
