= Aegean University =

Aegean University may refer to:

- University of the Aegean, a public university in several locations in Greece
- Ege University, also called Aegean University, a public research university in Bornova, İzmir, Turkey
