= Venia Giota =

Greek product designer (born 1982)

- Βένια Γιώτα
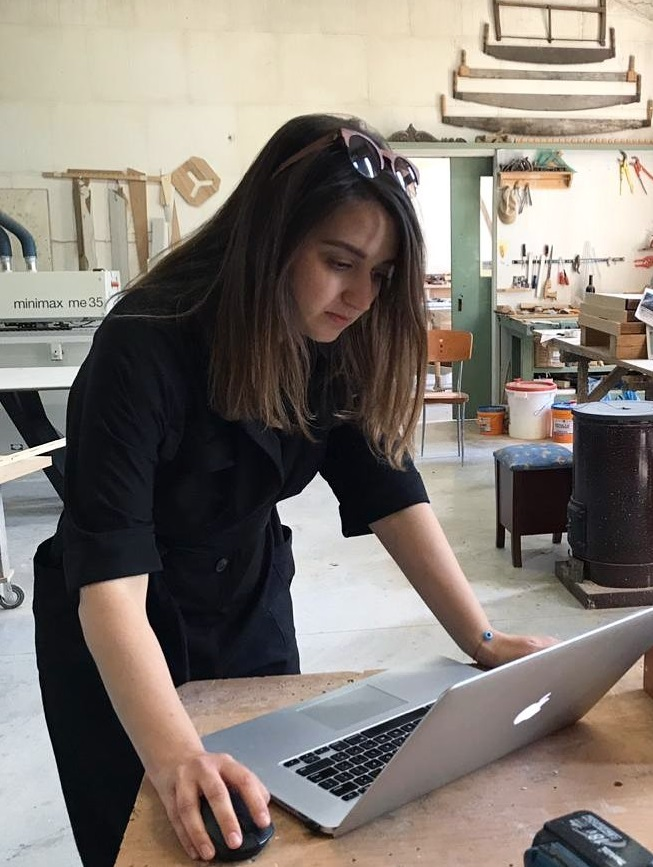
- Giota in 2020
- Born: 26 August 1982 (age 44); Karditsa, Greece
- Education: University of the Aegean
- Occupations: industrial designer; furniture designer; decoration artist
- Years active: Since 2005
- Awards: Toys Awards (2023), Red Dot (2012, 2013, 2014), IF Design (2011)
- Scientific career
- Workplaces: 3M Italia, Gino Finizio Design Management L.L.C., Claudio Bellini Design+Design L.L.C., CBD Group Industrial Design, Pinvita

Venia Giota (Greek: Βένια Γιώτα, born 26 August 1982) is a Greek product designer and industrial designer with a body of design works and accolades at the international level.

== Biography ==
Giota was born in Karditsa, Greece, where she grew up and completed her early education. She studied at the University of the Aegean at Department of Product and Systems Design Engineering, and earned her design diploma degree in 2005.

She afterwards moved to Italy to pursue postgraduate studies in Milan at the renowned design school, Domus Academy (2007). In Italy, she collaborated professionally as a young designer with businesses and furniture manufacturers such as 3M Italia, Gino Finizio Design Management L.L.C., and Claudio Bellini Design+Design L.L.C.

In 2012, she moved to China and worked for several years at CBD Group Industrial Design and the company Pinvita (2012–2020), where she engaged in various design projects and activities.

In 2020, she returned to Greece and focused on designing objects and furniture and on wooden decor, based in Karditsa.

Since 2021, she has been the co-founder of the design company "The Tea Club Toys", which specializes in designing (eco-friendly) wooden children's toys. In 2023, the company won an innovation award at the Toys Awards in Greece.

== Personal life ==
Since 2020, Giota has lived in Karditsa city. She is married to the Italian, product designer Giovanni Locci, and together they have one son.

== Awards ==
Giota has received several international distinctions for her design works:

- CUPCAKE (2023), 1st Prize, Toys Awards
- Hulu (2014), 1st Prize, Red Dot Award
- Good Design Award (2014), V.I.A (Vertical Intelligence Architecture) for Steelcase, US | Claudio Bellini Design+Design
- Red Dot Design Award (2013), Liz Chair for Walter Knoll, Claudio Bellini Design+Design, Interior Innovation Award, Germany
- IF Design Award (2012), My White, bathroom series, Saturn Bath Co, Ltd, Claudio Bellini Design+Design, South Korea
- Red Dot Design Award (2012), EGA, task chair, South Korea
- IF Design Award (2011), EGA, task chair, South Korea
- Changing with Beauty (2009) That's Design 2009, Salone del Mobile – Milan Design Week, Milan, Italy
- Coffee & Café (2004), 4th Biennale International Design, Saint-Étienne, France
- International Industrial Design Competition (2003), 2nd Prize, Executive Office Desk (organizer: DROMEAS S.A.)
