= Ximing =

Ximing may refer to:

- Jiang Ximing Chinese politician
- Pan Ximing Chinese footballer
- Ximing Temple
