= Vassilis Papatheodorou =

Greek writer

Vassilis Papatheodoru
- Born: 16 August 1967 (age 58) Athens, Greece
- Occupation: Writer, author

Website
- juvenilebooks.gr

Vassilis Papatheodorou (Greek: Βασίλης Παπαθεοδώρου; born 1967) is a Greek children’s and YA-writer.

== Biography and impact ==
Vassillis Papatheodorou was born in Athens in 1967. He attended the German School of Athens and went on to study Metallurgy and Chemical Engineering. While he was working in National Bank of Greece he started writing and publishing books for kids. Six of his books for children and teenagers (The message, The nine Caesars, Breath on the window pane, Full Blast, The long journey of the Chinese duck, Flying pages) are taught on the postgraduate Public Education training course at the University of the Aegean. He is a member of the Hellenic Author’s Society and PEN Greece. He lives in Athens.

In 2014 he was commissioned by the Goethe Institute to write a story in rememberence of the Nazi period as an action against the new wave of radical rightwing politics.

He has won the State Children’s Literature Prize on two occasions (2008, 2010) for "Breath on the Window Pane" and "Full Blast" respectively, being nominated for this award for five more times. He has won a further nineteen literary prizes and distinctions for his work –including four White Ravens from the International Youth Library- from the Greek Children’s Book Circle, the Women’s Literary Association and the Cypriot Board for Young and Young Adult Literature. He gives Creative Writing lessons (University of Western Macedonia, Cyprus Pedagogical Institute, Frederick University, Fairytale Museum of Nicosia) and is also member of the Hellenic Author’s Society and PEN Greece. He promotes constantly reading by visiting schools all over the country.

He is nominated for the 2022 Astrid Lindgren Memorial Award.

In October 2022 he was charged with possession of child pornography and his publishers said ended its association with him “as soon as it was informed that a criminal investigation is underway” against the author, who headed its children’s department.

In January 2025, he was acquitted by a court decision of the charges.

== Works ==
(2020) Scarlett, the cat of the bog fire Original title: Σκάρλετ, η γάτα της φωτιάς- Scarlett, I gata tis fotias

(2020) Babu, the tsunami dog Original title: Μπάμπου, το σκυλάκι του τσουνάμι- Babu, to skilaki tu tsunami

(2020) There is always something grating on me! (The book of whining 2) Original title: Όλο κάτι μου τη σπάει (Το βιβλίο της γκρίνιας 2)- Olo kati mu ti spai -To vivlio tis gkrinias 2

(2019) Kwibi, the Sensitive Gorilla Original title: Κουίμπι, ο ευαίσθητος γορίλας- Kouibi, o evesthitos gorilas

(2019) Lobo, the Wolf of the Wild West Original title: Λόμπο, ο λύκος της Άγριας Δύσης- Lobo, o likos tis agrias disis

(2019) Yvonne, the Indomitable Alpine Cow Original title: Υβόννη, η ατίθαση αγελάδα των Άλπεων- Ivoni, I atithassi agelada ton Alpeon

(2018) The Night the Stars Went Out Original title: Τη νύχτα που έσβησαν τ’αστέρια- Ti nichta pu esvissan t’asteria

(2018) Cher Ami, the Dove of War Original title: Σερ Αμί, το περιστέρι του πολέμου- Ser ami, to peristeri tu polemou

(2018) Avra, the Horse that Won the Olympic Games Original title: Αύρα, το άλογο ολυμπιονίκης- Avra, to alogo olympionikis

(2017) But why does everything bug me? (The book of whining) Original title: Μα γιατί μου φταίνε όλα; Το βιβλίο της γκρίνιας- Ma giati mou ftene ola? To vivlio tis gkrinias

(2017) Togo, the Dog of the Glaciers Original title: Τόγκο, το σκυλί των πάγων- Togo, to skili ton pagon

(2016) Karl, Fritz and the Egg of Happiness Original title: Ο Καρλ, ο Φριτς και το αβγό της ευτυχίας- O Karl, o Fritz ke to avgo tis eftichias

(2015) Unworthy Idol Original title: Ήταν το ίνδαλμά μου- Itan to indalma mou

(2014) Who Kidnapped Santa Claus? Original title: Ποιος απήγαγε τον Αϊ-Βασίλη;- Pios apigage ton Ai-Vassili?

(2014) Diary of a Coward Original title: Το ημερολόγιο ενός δειλού- To imerologio enos dilou

(2014) When Pink Flamingos Go on Strike Original title: Η λευκή απεργία των ροζ φλαμίνγκο- I lefki apergia ton roz flamingo

(2013) Yes, Virginia, there is a Santa Claus! Original title: Ναι, Βιρτζίνια, υπάρχει Άγιος Βασίλης!- Ne, Virtzinia, iparchi Agios Vassilis!

(2013) School Play Original title: Σχολική παράσταση- Scholiki parastassi

(2012) The Lords of the Dump Original title: Οι άρχοντες των σκουπιδιών- I archontes ton skoupidion

(2011) Flying Pages Original title: Ιπτάμενες σελίδες- Iptamenes selides

(2011) Santa Claus on the Radar Original title: Ο Αϊ Βασίλης στο ραντάρ- O Ai-Vassilis sto radar

(2010) A Funny Epidemic Original title: Μια αστεία επιδημία- Mia astia epidimia

(2009) Alpha or Three Days that made a Difference Original title: Άλφα- Alfa

(2009) Full Blast Original title: Στη διαπασών- Sti diapason

(2008) The Long Journey of the Chinese Duck Original title: Το μεγάλο ταξίδι της κινέζικης πάπιας- To megalo taxidi tis kinezikis papias

(2007) Who Kidnapped Santa Claus? Original title: Ποιος απήγαγε τον Αϊ-Βασίλη;- Pios apigage ton Ai-Vassili?

(2007) Breath on a Window Pane Original title: Χνότα στο τζάμι- Hnota sto tzami

(2004) The Nine Caesars Original title: Οι εννέα Καίσαρες- I ennea Kesares

(2001) Alpha or Three Days that made a Difference Original title: Άλφα- Alfa

(2001) The Message Original title: Το μήνυμα- To minima

(2000) School Play Original title: Σχολική παράσταση- Scholiki parastassi
