= Xu Ruiyun =

Chinese mathematician (1915–1969)

- 徐瑞云
- Born: 15 June 1915; Shanghai, Republic of China
- Died: 23 January 1969 (aged 53); Hangzhou, People's Republic of China
- Education: Zhejiang University; Ludwig-Maximilians-Universität München
- Spouse: Jiang Ximing
- Scientific career
- Fields: Mathematical analysis, in particular Fourier series
- Workplaces: Zhejiang University; Hangzhou University
- Doctoral advisor: Constantin Carathéodory
- Notable students: Yuan-Shih Chow

Xu Ruiyun (Chinese: 徐瑞云; 15 June 1915 – 23 January 1969), also known as Süe-Yung Zee-Kiang, (Note: "Kiang" is the romanization of her husband's last name Jiang (江).) was a Chinese mathematician specialising in mathematical analysis. A student of Constantin Carathéodory, she was the first Chinese woman to receive a doctorate in mathematics. In 1941, she returned to China and worked at Zhejiang University and later Hangzhou University. In 1969, during the Cultural Revolution, she died by suicide.

== Biography ==
Xu was born in Shanghai on 15 June 1915. Her family originally came from Cixi, Zhejiang. Her father was an industrialist who owned a factory making socks. In 1927, she entered Wu Pen Girls' School. In 1932 she entered Zhejiang University in Hangzhou, where she studied under Chen Jiangong and Su Buqing. She graduated in 1936 and was hired as a teaching assistant. At Zhejiang University she also entered a relationship with biology student Jiang Ximing. They married in February 1937.

In 1937, Xu and Jiang received the Humboldt scholarship to study in Germany. They left China in May 1937, were delayed for a month and a half in Milan, before arriving in Germany in August. They first studied the German language in Berlin for two months, and then entered the PhD program at the Ludwig-Maximilians-Universität München. Xu was supervised by Constantin Carathéodory and studied trigonometric series, in particular Fourier series. At the end of 1940, she received her doctorate, becoming the first Chinese woman PhD in mathematics.

In January 1941, Xu and Jiang left Germany. In March, they arrived in Chongqing, the wartime capital of China during the Second Sino-Japanese War. In April, they arrived in Meitan, Guizhou, where the College of Science of Zhejiang University held its wartime campus. There she lectured in mathematics, and her students included Cao Xihua, Ye Yanqian, and some later Chinese mathematicians. After the end of the war, Xu was promoted to professor in 1946, when she was 31. She returned to Hangzhou with Zhejiang University in the same year.

The People's Republic of China was established in 1949. During the 1952 reorganisation of Chinese higher education, Xu remained at Zhejiang University, where she was the office director of teaching and research in higher mathematics. Around this time she joined the China Democratic League and studied communism. In 1953 she was moved to Zhejiang Teachers College (Chinese: 浙江师范学院, later became Hangzhou University in 1958), where she chaired the department of mathematics. During her time at Zhejiang Teachers College, she learned Russian and translated Isidor Natanson's Theory of Functions of a Real Variable, which was published in Chinese in 1955.

Around this time, Xu was elected as a representative to the Zhejiang Provincial People's Congress in 1954 and a member of the People's Government of Zhejiang. She was also elected as the secretary general of the Zhejiang Mathematical Society (浙江省数学会). In 1956, Xu joined the Chinese Communist Party.

In 1964, Xu and Hua Luogeng chaired the first national conference on functional analysis at the Hengshan Hotel in Shanghai. She was the CCP party group leader at the conference. In 1965, Xu began to translate Carathéodory's Theory of Functions of a Complex Variable. She could not complete it due to her workload in the Socialist Education Movement. After the Cultural Revolution began in 1966, Xu began to undergo struggle sessions within Hangzhou University. She was forced to kneel for long times and was whipped. In 1968, Xu's husband Jiang Ximing was accused of being a German spy, and Xu was detained and was pressured to confess her alleged spy activities. On 23 January 1969, Xu committed suicide by hanging.

In 1978, Hangzhou University held a commemoration ceremony and rehabilitated Xu. She was buried in Liuxia Subdistrict, Hangzhou. In 2009, the department of mathematics of Zhejiang University purchased a new grave for Xu and made a new tombstone. On 13 June 2015, Zhejiang University held a conference commemorating the 100th anniversary of Xu's birth.

== Works and influences ==
Xue et al. consider Xu to be a member of the third generation of the mathematical analysis tradition at Zhejiang University. Xu's publications include:

- Kiang, Süe-Yung (18 January 1941). "Über die Fouriersche Entwicklung der singulären Funktion bei einer Lebesgueschen Zerlegung". Mathematische Zeitschrift. 47 (published December 1942): 330–342. doi:10.1007/BF01180966. (Note: Some sources consider this work Xu's PhD dissertation.)
- Zee-Kiang, Süe-Yung (April 1944). "On the Variation of Increasing Functions Whose First 2n Fourier Coefficients are Given". Journal of the London Mathematical Society. 19 (74): 71–77. doi:10.1112/jlms/19.74_Part_2.71.

Xu's translations include:

- Natanson, Isidor (2010) [1955]. Chen, Jiangong (ed.). 实变函数论 [Theory of Functions of a Real Variable] (in Chinese). Translated by Xu, Ruiyun (5 ed.). ISBN 9787040292213.
- Hardy, G. H.; Rogosinski, W. W. (1978) [1956]. 富里埃级数 [Fourier Series]. Translated by Xu, Ruiyun; Wang, Silei.

When she was teaching at Zhejiang University, Xu was the thesis advisor of the Chinese American mathematician Yuan-Shih Chow. Three members of the Chinese Academy of Sciences–Shi Zhongci, Wang Yuan, and Hu Hesheng–had taken her classes at the university. Her adopted daughter also became a PhD in mathematics.
