= Constantin Carathéodory =

Greek mathematician (1873–1950)

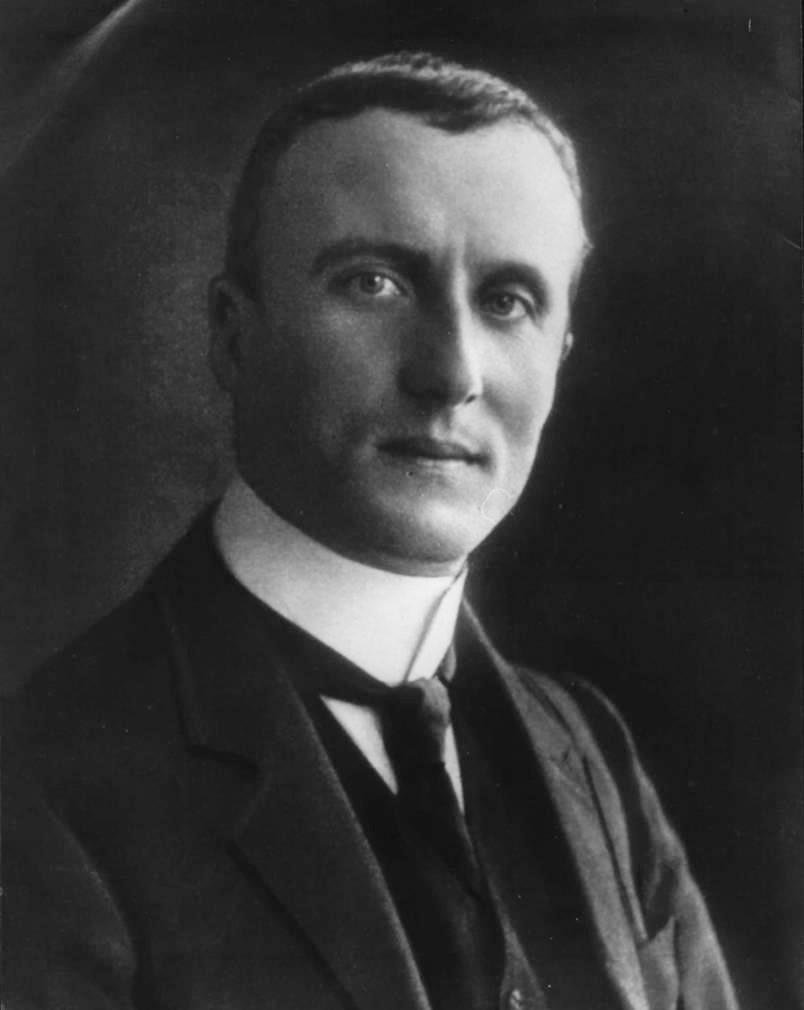
- Constantin Carathéodory
- Born: 13 September 1873; Berlin, German Empire
- Died: 2 February 1950 (aged 76); Munich, West Germany
- Citizenship: Greek
- Education: Humboldt University of Berlin; University of Göttingen
- Known for: Carathéodory conjecture; Carathéodory function; Carathéodory metric; Carathéodory theorems; Carathéodory's criterion; Carathéodory's lemma; Carathéodory's positivity criterion for holomorphic functions; Carathéodory's principle; Carnot–Carathéodory metric; Adiabatic accessibility; Cyclic polytope; Prime end; General theory of outer measures; Axiomatic formulation of thermodynamics
- Scientific career
- Fields: Calculus of variations; Real analysis; Complex analysis; Measure theory
- Workplaces: University of Bonn; Hannover Technical High School; Breslau Technical High School; University of Göttingen; Humboldt University of Berlin; LMU Munich; National Technical University of Athens; Ionian University of Smyrna
- Doctoral advisor: Hermann Minkowski
- Doctoral students: Paul Finsler; Hans Rademacher; Georg Aumann; Hermann Boerner; Ernst Peschl; Wladimir Seidel; Nazım Terzioğlu; Xu Ruiyun

Constantin Carathéodory (Greek: Κωνσταντίνος Καραθεοδωρή, romanized: Konstantinos Karatheodori; 13 September 1873 – 2 February 1950) was a Greek mathematician who spent most of his professional career in Germany. He is the author of significant contributions to real and complex analysis, the calculus of variations, and measure theory and of an axiomatic formulation of thermodynamics. Carathéodory is considered one of the greatest mathematicians of his era and the most renowned Greek mathematician since antiquity.

== Origins ==
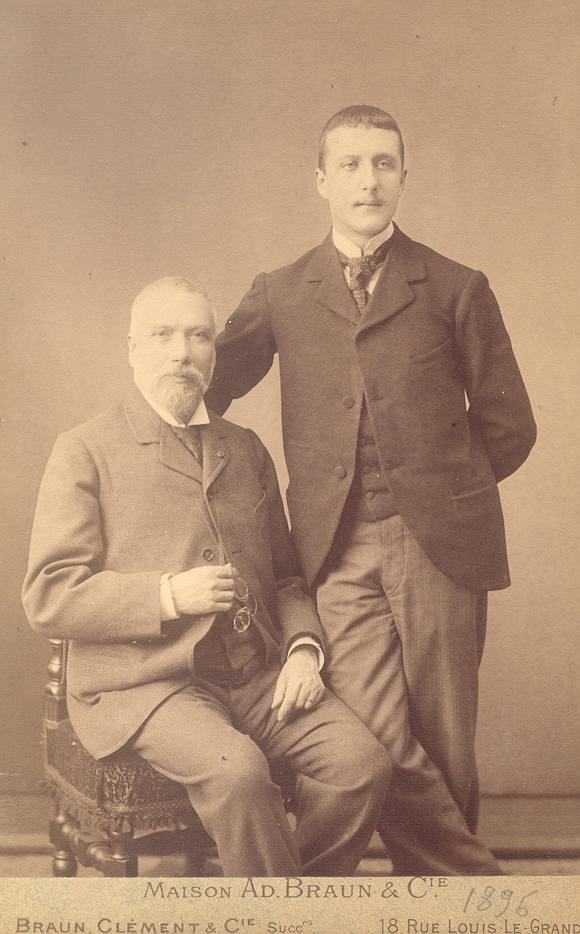
Carathéodory with his father, Stephanos, in 1900.

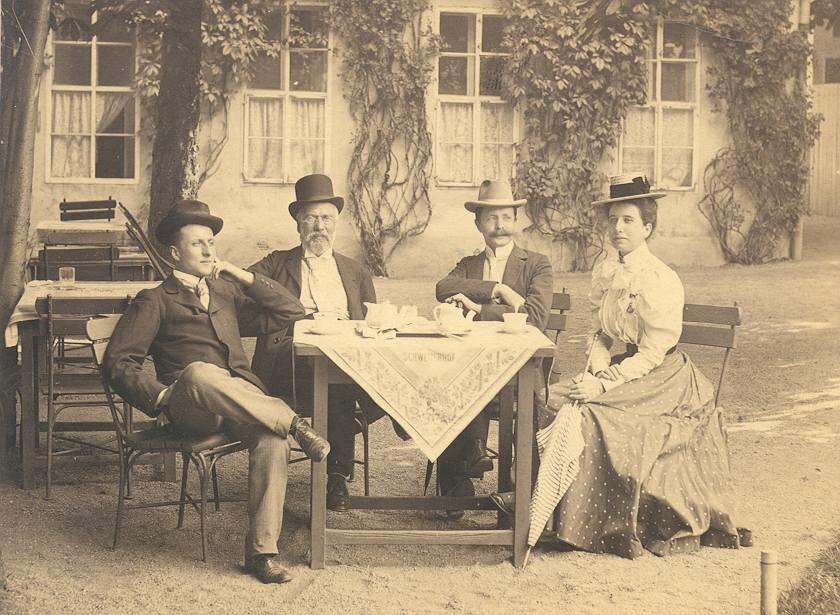
Carathéodory (left) pictured sitting with his father, brother in law and sister, Carlsbad 1898

Constantin Carathéodory was born in 1873 in Berlin to Greek parents and grew up in Brussels. His father Stephanos, a lawyer, served as the Ottoman ambassador to Belgium, St. Petersburg and Berlin. His mother, Despina, née Petrokokkinos, was from the island of Chios. The Carathéodory family, originally from Bosna, was well established and respected in Constantinople, and its members held many important governmental positions. His grandfather, the Ottoman Greek physician Constantinos Caratheodory, was the personal doctor to Sultan Abdülmecit I.

The Carathéodory family spent 1874–75 in Constantinople, where Constantin's paternal grandfather lived, while his father Stephanos was on leave. Then in 1875 they went to Brussels when Stephanos was appointed there as Ottoman Ambassador. In Brussels, Constantin's younger sister Julia was born. The year 1879 was a tragic one for the family since Constantin's paternal grandfather died in that year, but much more tragically, Constantin's mother Despina died of pneumonia in Cannes. Constantin's maternal grandmother took on the task of bringing up Constantin and Julia in his father's home in Belgium. They employed a German maid who taught the children to speak German. Constantin was already bilingual in French and Greek by this time.

Constantin began his formal schooling at a private school in Vanderstock in 1881. He left after two years and then spent time with his father on a visit to Berlin, and also spent the winters of 1883–84 and 1884–85 on the Italian Riviera. Back in Brussels in 1885 he attended a grammar school for a year where he first began to become interested in mathematics. In 1886, he entered the high school Athénée Royal d'Ixelles and studied there until his graduation in 1891. Twice during his time at this school Constantin won a prize as the best mathematics student in Belgium.

At this stage Carathéodory began training as a military engineer. He attended the Belgian Royal Military Academy from October 1891 to May 1895 and he also studied at the École d'Application from 1893 to 1896. In 1897 a war broke out between the Ottoman Empire and Greece. This put Carathéodory in a difficult position since he sided with the Greeks, yet his father served the government of the Ottoman Empire. Since he was a trained engineer he was offered a job in the British colonial service. This job took him to Egypt where he worked on the construction of the Assiut dam until April 1900. During periods when construction work had to stop due to floods, he studied mathematics from some textbooks he had with him, such as Jordan's Cours d'Analyse and Salmon's text on the analytic geometry of conic sections. He also visited the Cheops pyramid and made measurements which he wrote up and published in 1901. He also published a book on Egypt in the same year which contained a wealth of information on the history and geography of the country.

== Studies and university career ==
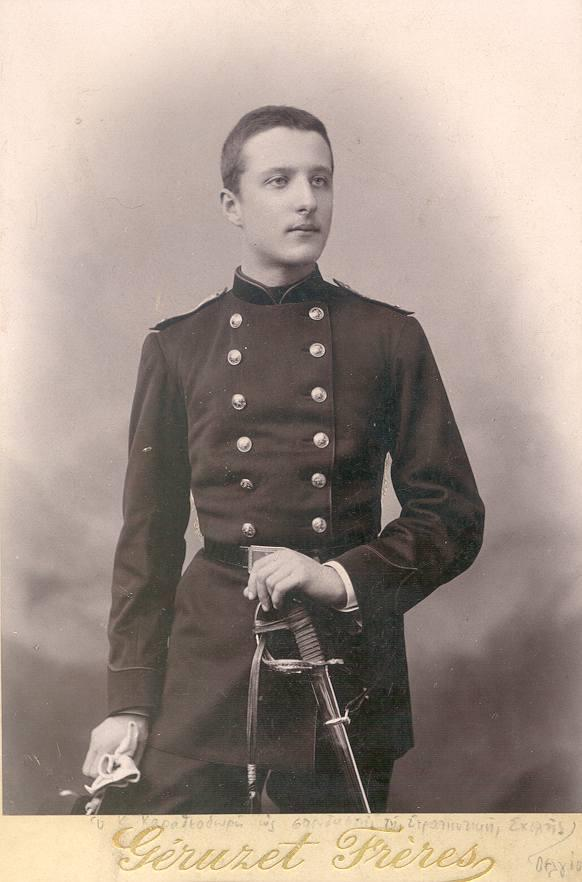
Young Carathéodory

Carathéodory studied engineering in Belgium at the Royal Military Academy, where he was considered a charismatic and brilliant student.

=== University career ===
- 1900 Studies at Humboldt University of Berlin.
- 1902 Completed graduation at University of Göttingen (1904 Ph.D., 1905 Habilitation)
- 1908 Dozent at University of Bonn
- 1909 Ordinary Professor at Hannover Technical High School.
- 1910 Ordinary Professor at Breslau Technical High School.
- 1913 Professor following Klein at University of Göttingen.
- 1919 Professor at Humboldt University of Berlin
- 1919 Elected to Prussian Academy of Science.
- 1920 University Dean at Ionian University of Smyrna (later, University of the Aegean).
- 1922 Professor at University of Athens.
- 1922 Professor at Athens Polytechnic.
- 1924 Professor following Lindemann at Ludwig-Maximilians-Universität München (LMU).
- 1938 Retirement from professorship. Continued working at Bavarian Academy of Science

=== Doctoral students ===
Carathéodory had about 20 doctoral students among these being Hans Rademacher, known for his work on analysis and number theory, and Paul Finsler known for his creation of Finsler space.

=== Academic contacts in Germany ===
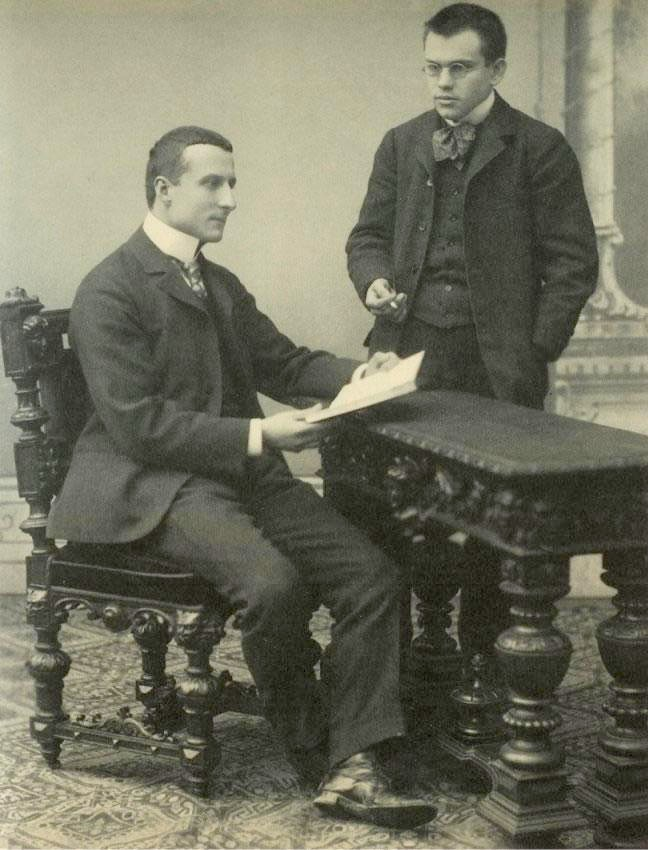
Carathéodory (left) with Hungarian mathematician Lipót Fejér (1880–1959) (standing to the right).

Carathéodory had numerous contacts in Germany. They included such famous names as Hermann Minkowski, David Hilbert, Felix Klein, Albert Einstein, Edmund Landau, Hermann Amandus Schwarz, and Lipót Fejér. During the difficult period of World War II, his close associates at the Bavarian Academy of Sciences were Perron and Tietze.

Einstein, then a member of the Prussian Academy of Sciences in Berlin, was working on his general theory of relativity when he contacted Carathéodory for clarifications on the Hamilton-Jacobi equation and canonical transformations. He wanted to see a satisfactory derivation of the former and the origins of the latter. Einstein told Carathéodory his derivation was "beautiful" and recommended its publication in the Annalen der Physik. Einstein employed the former in a 1917 paper titled Zum Quantensatz von Sommerfeld und Epstein (On the Quantum Theorem of Sommerfeld and Epstein). Carathéodory explained some fundamental details of the canonical transformations and referred Einstein to E.T. Whittaker's Analytical Dynamics. Einstein was trying to solve the problem of "closed time-lines" or the geodesics corresponding to the closed trajectory of light and free particles in a static universe, which he introduced in 1917.

Landau and Schwarz stimulated his interest in the study of complex analysis.

=== Academic contacts in Greece ===
While in Germany, Carathéodory retained numerous links with the Greek academic world, details of which can be found in Georgiadou's book. He was directly involved with the reorganization of Greek universities. An especially close friend and colleague in Athens was Nicolaos Kritikos who had attended his lectures at Göttingen, later going with him to Smyrna, then becoming professor at Athens Polytechnic. Kritikos and Carathéodory helped the Greek topologist Christos Papakyriakopoulos take a doctorate in topology at Athens University in 1943 under very difficult circumstances. While teaching at Athens University, Carathéodory had Evangelos Stamatis as an undergraduate student, who subsequently achieved considerable distinction as a scholar of ancient Greek mathematical classics.

== Works ==
=== Calculus of variations ===
In his doctoral dissertation, Carathéodory showed how to extend solutions to discontinuous cases and studied isoperimetric problems.

Previously, between the mid-1700s to the mid-1800s, Leonhard Euler, Adrien-Marie Legendre, and Carl Gustav Jacob Jacobi were able to establish necessary but insufficient conditions for the existence of a strong relative minimum. In 1879, Karl Weierstrass added a fourth that does indeed guarantee such a quantity exists. Carathéodory constructed his method for deriving sufficient conditions based on the use of the Hamilton–Jacobi equation to construct a field of extremals. The ideas are closely related to light propagation in optics. The method became known as Carathéodory's method of equivalent variational problems or the royal road to the calculus of variations. A key advantage of Carathéodory's work on this topic is that it illuminates the relation between the calculus of variations and partial differential equations. It allows for quick and elegant derivations of conditions of sufficiency in the calculus of variations and leads directly to the Euler–Lagrange equation and the Weierstrass condition. He published his Variationsrechnung und Partielle Differentialgleichungen Erster Ordnung (Calculus of Variations and First-order Partial Differential Equations) in 1935.

More recently, Carathéodory's work on the calculus of variations and the Hamilton-Jacobi equation has been taken into the theory of optimal control and dynamic programming.

=== Convex geometry ===
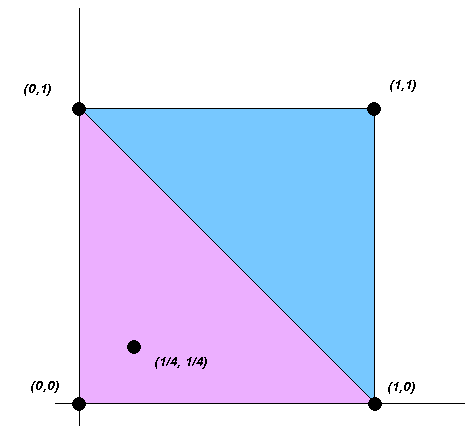
An illustration of Carathéodory's theorem (convex hull) for a square in R^{2}.

Carathéodory's theorem in convex geometry states that if a point $x$ of $\mathbb{R}^d$ lies in the convex hull of a set $P$, then $x$ can be written as the convex combination of at most $d + 1$ points in $P$. Namely, there is a subset $P'$ of $P$ consisting of $d + 1$ or fewer points such that $x$ lies in the convex hull of $P'$. Equivalently, $x$ lies in an $r$-simplex with vertices in $P$, where $r \leq d$. The smallest $r$ that makes the last statement valid for each $x$ in the convex hull of P is defined as the Carathéodory's number of $P$. Depending on the properties of $P$, upper bounds lower than the one provided by Carathéodory's theorem can be obtained.

He is credited with the authorship of the Carathéodory conjecture claiming that a closed convex surface admits at least two umbilic points. The conjecture was proven in 2024 by Brendan Guilfoyle and Wilhelm Klingenberg.

=== Real analysis ===
He proved an existence theorem for the solution to ordinary differential equations under mild regularity conditions.

Another theorem of his on the derivative of a function at a point could be used to prove the Chain Rule and the formula for the derivative of inverse functions.

=== Complex analysis ===
He greatly extended the theory of conformal transformation proving his theorem about the extension of conformal mapping to the boundary of Jordan domains. In studying boundary correspondence he originated the theory of prime ends. He exhibited an elementary proof of the Schwarz lemma.

Carathéodory was also interested in the theory of functions of multiple complex variables. In his investigations on this subject he sought analogs of classical results from the single-variable case. He proved that a ball in $\mathbb{C}^2$ is not holomorphically equivalent to the bidisc.

=== Theory of measure ===
He is credited with the Carathéodory extension theorem which is fundamental to modern measure theory. Later Carathéodory extended the theory from sets to Boolean algebras.

=== Thermodynamics ===
Thermodynamics had been a subject dear to Carathéodory since his time in Belgium. In 1909, he published a pioneering work "Investigations on the Foundations of Thermodynamics" in which he formulated the second law of thermodynamics axiomatically, that is, without the use of Carnot engines and refrigerators and only by mathematical reasoning. This is yet another version of the second law, alongside the statements of Clausius, and of Kelvin and Planck. Carathéodory's version attracted the attention of some of the top physicists of the time, including Max Planck, Max Born, and Arnold Sommerfeld. According to Bailyn's survey of thermodynamics, Carathéodory's approach is called "mechanical," rather than "thermodynamic." Max Born acclaimed this "first axiomatically rigid foundation of thermodynamics" and he expressed his enthusiasm in his letters to Einstein. However, Max Planck had some misgivings in that while he was impressed by Carathéodory's mathematical prowess, he did not accept that this was a fundamental formulation, given the statistical nature of the second law.

In his theory he simplified the basic concepts, for instance heat is not an essential concept but a derived one. He formulated the axiomatic principle of irreversibility in thermodynamics stating that inaccessibility of states is related to the existence of entropy, where temperature is the integration function. The second law of thermodynamics was expressed via the following axiom: "In the neighbourhood of any initial state, there are states which cannot be approached arbitrarily close through adiabatic changes of state." In this connexion he coined the term adiabatic accessibility.

=== Optics ===
Carathéodory's work in optics is closely related to his method in the calculus of variations. In 1926 he gave a strict and general proof that no system of lenses and mirrors can avoid aberration, except for the trivial case of plane mirrors. In his later work he gave the theory of the Schmidt telescope. In his Geometrische Optik (1937), Carathéodory demonstrated the equivalence of Huygens' principle and Fermat's principle starting from the former using Cauchy's theory of characteristics. He argued that an important advantage of his approach was that it covers the integral invariants of Henri Poincaré and Élie Cartan and completes the Malus law. He explained that in his investigations in optics, Pierre de Fermat conceived a minimum principle similar to that enunciated by Hero of Alexandria to study reflection.

=== Historical ===
During the Second World War Carathéodory edited two volumes of Euler's Complete Works dealing with the Calculus of Variations which were submitted for publication in 1946.

== The University of Smyrna ==
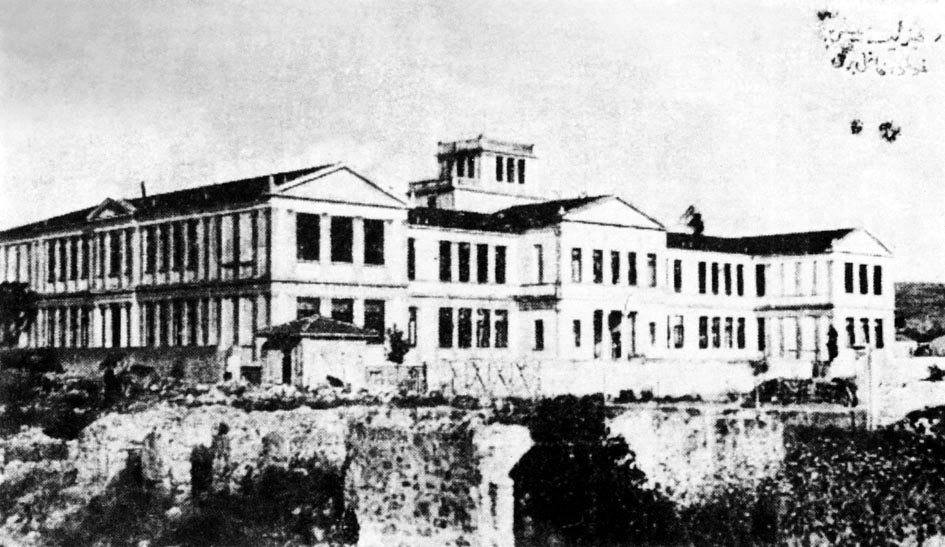
Photo of the Ionian University of Smyrna.

At the time, Athens was the only major educational centre in the wider area and had limited capacity to sufficiently satisfy the growing educational needs of the eastern part of the Aegean Sea and the Balkans. Carathéodory, who was a professor at the University of Berlin at the time, proposed the establishment of a new university - the difficulties regarding the establishment of a Greek university in Constantinople led him to consider three other cities: Thessaloniki, Chios and Smyrna.

At the invitation of the Greek Prime Minister Eleftherios Venizelos, he submitted a plan on 20 October 1919 for the creation of a new university at Smyrna in Asia Minor, to be named Ionian University of Smyrna. In 1920 Carathéodory was appointed dean of the university and took a major part in establishing the institution, touring Europe to buy books and equipment. The university, however, never actually admitted students, due to the War in Asia Minor which ended in the Great Fire of Smyrna. Carathéodory managed to save books from the library and was only rescued at the last moment by a journalist who took him by rowboat to the battleship Naxos which was standing by. Carathéodory brought to Athens some of the university library and stayed there, teaching at the university and technical school until 1924.

In 1924, Carathéodory was appointed professor of mathematics at the Ludwig-Maximilians-Universität München (LMU), and held this position until retirement in 1938. He later worked at the Bavarian Academy of Sciences until his death in 1950.

The new Greek university in the broader area of the Southeast Mediterranean region, as originally envisioned by Carathéodory, finally materialised with the establishment of the Aristotle University of Thessaloniki in 1925.

== Linguistic and oratorical talents ==
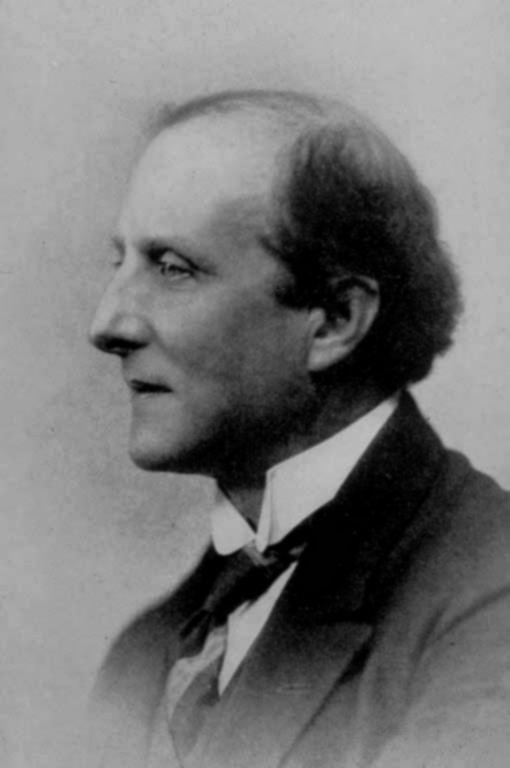
Caratheodory at a mature age.

Carathéodory excelled at languages, much like many members of his family. Greek and French were his first languages, and he mastered German with such perfection, that his writings composed in the German language are stylistic masterworks. Carathéodory also spoke and wrote English, Italian, Turkish, and the ancient languages without any effort. Such an impressive linguistic arsenal enabled him to communicate and exchange ideas directly with other mathematicians during his numerous travels, and greatly extended his fields of knowledge.

Much more than that, Carathéodory was a treasured conversation partner for his fellow professors in the Munich Department of Philosophy. The well-respected German philologist and professor of ancient languages, Kurt von Fritz, praised Carathéodory on the grounds that from him one could learn an endless amount about the old and new Greece, the old Greek language, and Hellenic mathematics. Von Fritz conducted numerous philosophical discussions with Carathéodory.

The mathematician sent his son Stephanos and daughter Despina to a German high school, but they also obtained daily additional instruction in Greek language and culture from a Greek priest, and at home he allowed them to speak Greek only.

Carathéodory was a talented public speaker, and was often invited to give speeches. In 1936, it was he who handed out the first ever Fields Medals at the meeting of the International Congress of Mathematicians in Oslo, Norway.

== Legacy ==
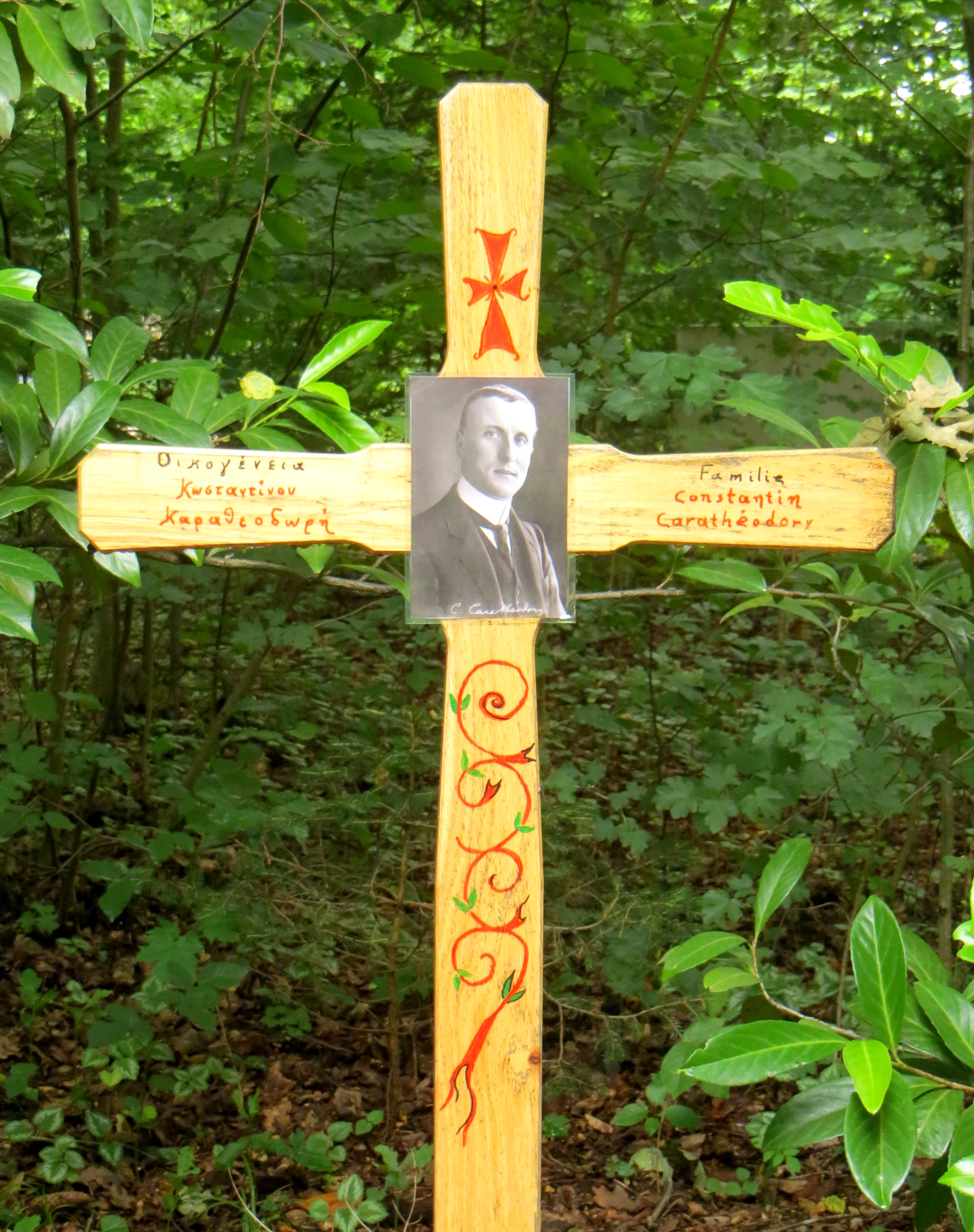
Grave of Carathéodory in Munich.

In 2002, in recognition of his achievements, the LMU Munich named one of the largest lecture rooms in the mathematical institute the Constantin-Carathéodory Lecture Hall.

In the town of Nea Vyssa, Caratheodory's ancestral home, a unique family museum is to be found. The museum is located in the central square of the town near to its church, and includes a number of Karatheodory's personal items, as well as letters he exchanged with Albert Einstein. More information is provided at the original website of the club, http://www.s-karatheodoris.gr.

At the same time, Greek authorities had long since intended to create a museum honoring Karatheodoris in Komotini, a major town of the northeastern Greek region, more than 200 km away from his home town above. On 21 March 2009, the "Karatheodoris" Museum (Καραθεοδωρής) opened its gates to the public in Komotini.

The coordinator of the museum, Athanasios Lipordezis (Αθανάσιος Λιπορδέζης), has noted that the museum provides a home for original manuscripts of the mathematician running to about 10,000 pages, including correspondence with the German mathematician Arthur Rosenthal for the algebraization of measure. At the showcase, visitors are also able to view the books " Gesammelte mathematische Schriften Band 1,2,3,4 ", "Mass und ihre Algebraiserung", " Reelle Functionen Band 1", " Zahlen/Punktionen Funktionen ", and a number of others. Handwritten letters by Carathéodory to Albert Einstein and Hellmuth Kneser, as well as photographs of the Carathéodory family, are on display.

Efforts to furnish the museum with more exhibits are ongoing.

== Publications ==
=== Journal articles ===
A complete list of Carathéodory's journal article publications can be found in his Collected Works(Ges. Math. Schr.). Notable publications are:

- Über die kanonischen Veränderlichen in der Variationsrechnung der mehrfachen Integrale
- Über das Schwarzsche Lemma bei analytischen Funktionen von zwei komplexen Veränderlichen
- Über die diskontinuierlichen Lösungen in der Variationsrechnung. Diss. Göttingen Univ. 1904; Ges. Math. Schr. I 3–79.
- Über die starken Maxima und Minima bei einfachen Integralen. Habilitationsschrift Göttingen 1905; Math. Annalen 62 1906 449–503; Ges. Math. Schr. I 80–142.
- Untersuchungen über die Grundlagen der Thermodynamik, Math. Ann. 67 (1909) pp. 355–386; Ges. Math. Schr. II 131–166.
- Über das lineare Mass von Punktmengen – eine Verallgemeinerung des Längenbegriffs., Gött. Nachr. (1914) 404–406; Ges. Math. Schr. IV 249–275.
- Elementarer Beweis für den Fundamentalsatz der konformen Abbildungen. Schwarzsche Festschrift, Berlin 1914; Ges. Math. Schr.IV 249–275.
- Zur Axiomatic der speziellen Relativitätstheorie. Sitzb. Preuss. Akad. Wiss. (1924) 12–27; Ges. Math. Schr. II 353–373.
- Variationsrechnung in Frank P. & von Mises (eds): Die Differential= und Integralgleichungen der Mechanik und Physik, Braunschweig 1930 (Vieweg); New York 1961 (Dover) 227–279; Ges. Math. Schr. I 312–370.
- Entwurf für eine Algebraisierung des Integralbegriffs, Sitzber. Bayer. Akad. Wiss. (1938) 27–69; Ges. Math. Schr. IV 302–342.

=== Books ===
- Carathéodory, Constantin (1968) [1st pub. 1918], Vorlesungen über reelle Funktionen (3rd ed.), Leipzig: Teubner, ISBN 978-0-8284-0038-1, MR 0225940 Reprinted 1968 (Chelsea)
- Conformal Representation, Cambridge 1932 (Cambridge Tracts in Mathematics and Physics)
- Geometrische Optik, Berlin, 1937
- Elementare Theorie des Spiegelteleskops von B. Schmidt (Elementary Theory of B. Schmidt's Reflecting Telescope), Leipzig Teubner, 1940 36 pp.; Ges. math. Schr. II 234–279
- Funktionentheorie I, II, Basel 1950, 1961 (Birkhäuser). English translation: Theory of Functions of a Complex Variable, 2 vols, New York, Chelsea Publishing Company, 3rd ed 1958
- Mass und Integral und ihre Algebraisierung, Basel 1956. English translation, Measure and Integral and Their Algebraisation, New York, Chelsea Publishing Company, 1963
- Variationsrechnung und partielle Differentialgleichungen erster Ordnung, Leipzig, 1935. English translation next reference
- Calculus of Variations and Partial Differential Equations of the First Order, 2 vols. vol. I 1965, vol. II 1967 Holden-Day.
- Gesammelte mathematische Schriften München 1954–7 (Beck) I–V.

== See also ==
- Domain (mathematical analysis)
- Nemytskii operator
- Herbert Callen, who also sought an axiomatic formulation of thermodynamics
