= Marie Torhorst =

German teacher and politician (1888–1989)

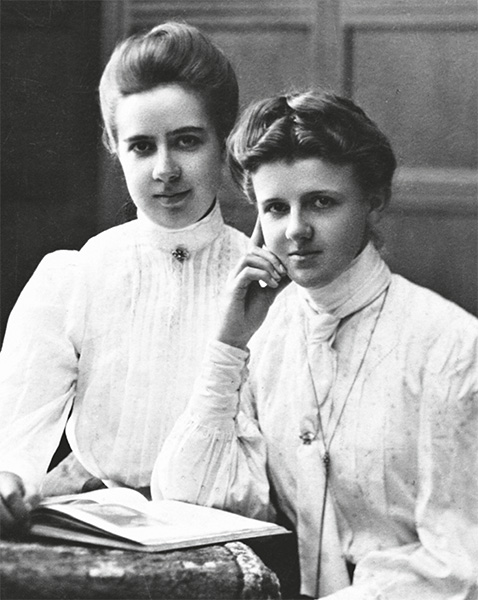
- Marie Torhorst (right) with her sister Adelheid Torhorst 1884 - 1968 (left) 1911
- Born: 28 December 1888; Ledde (Osnabrück), Province of Hanover, Prussia, Germany
- Died: 7 May 1989; East Berlin, German Democratic Republic (East Germany)
- Education: University of Bonn "Handelshochschule Köln" "Stift Keppel" (Lehrerinnenseminar) Allenbach
- Occupations: Teacher; Political activist Feminist activist Education activist Politician; Minister for People's Education
- Political party: SPD; KPD; SED
- Spouse: none
- Children: none
- Parents: Arnold Friedrich Ernst Torhorst (1841-1909) (father); Maria Sophia Luise Jacobina Smend (1847-1923) (mother)

Marie Torhorst (28 December 1888 – 7 May 1989) was a German school teacher and political activist who became an East German politician. She served as Minister for People's Education in the state of Thuringia between 1947 and 1950. Some sources identify her as "the first-ever female minister (on state or national level) in the history of Germany". (Note: It is fairly widely accepted today that Germany's first female minister was Minna Faßhauer who served as Volkskommissarin für Volksbildung ("People's Commissar for People's Education") in the Socialist Republic of Braunschweig between November 1918 and February 1919. The revolutionary context of 1918/19 nevertheless opens the way for objections that the short-lived Socialist Republic of Braunschweig was "not a real German state".) Others are content to record that, within Germany, she was the first-ever female minister in the state of Thuringia.

Marie Torhorst stated and proved what is today known as the Carathéodory-Torhorst theorem in her 1918 doctoral dissertation. The dissertation was subsequently lost and Torhorst's contribution was for many decades overlooked; but in the twenty-first century mathematics scholars are happy to acknowledge and celebrate her work.

== Life ==
=== Provenance ===
Marie Torhorst was born at the end of the so-called "Year of the Three Emperors" in Ledde, then as now a sleepy village in the flat countryside west of Osnabrück. She was the seventh and youngest child of Arnold Torhorst (1841–1909), the local parson and his wife, born Luise Smend (1847–1923). The family seems to have been intellectually gifted. Marie's elder sister, Adelheid, would also achieve a measure of eminence in teaching and, after 1945, in politics. The sisters would later, jointly, have a secondary school named after them. Luise Torhorst had inherited a useful sum of money as a result of which she was able to see to it that not just her four sons, but also her three daughters, received a full education. Marie completed her own schooling at an "Oberlyzeum" (single-sex girls' secondary school).

=== Student ===
Sources are not completely consistent as to when she embarked on her university education, much of which coincided with the First World War. She attended the University of Bonn, studying Geography, Mathematics and Physics. There are at least two reference to her having also studied at the University of Göttingen.It was from Bonn that in 1918 she received her doctorate: the work was supervised by Hans Hahn. Her dissertation was entitled "Über die Randmenge einfach-zusammenhängender ebener Gebiete": a core conclusion has become known among her scholarly admirers as the Carathéodory-Torhorst theorem or, more simply, as the Torhorst theorem. It might have been thought that her doctorate should have provided a launch pad for a life-long career in the universities sector. There were still vanishingly few women working in high-level academic research at this time, however, and at least one commentator has identified "a lack of confidence in her own mathematical ability" in her autobiography. Also, with Germany economically, militarily and politically broken and on the brink of a year of revolutions in the ports and industrial centres, there was widespread nervousness that Lenin's so-called October Revolution might yet spread uncontrollably through the European continent. Marie Torhorst's own student record of left-wing political activism was no secret.

She joined the socialist "Studenten-Arbeitsgemeinschaft" (apparently an umbrella group of socialist student associations) in 1917. According to one source she passed the exams necessary to qualify her for teaching in state schools in 1919 and 1920. Elsewhere it is indicated that she had already attended the "Stift Keppel" in Allenbach, where she successfully completed a two years teacher-training course in her early 20s, between 1903 and 1905. During the early twentieth century her political record made it hard for her to find a permanent teaching post. She was able to find a part-time teaching position at a Catholic girls' school in Bonn, however, and also found work with the university as a university librarian. It was probably in 1922/23 that she completed several terms of study at the "Handelshochschule" (loosely, "business college", at the time being subsumed into the university) in Cologne, studying business administration and economics, following which she received a qualification in teaching business studies.

=== Teacher ===
In 1923 Torhorst took on the headship of a private business school for the "Frauenerwerbs- und Ausbildungsverein" (loosely, "Women's employment and training association") in Bremen. She continued to lead the business school till 1929. She also teamed up with politically like-minded teacher colleagues, during this period, to organise evening courses for young people who had been excluded from state schools in the area.

Her political and feminist beliefs had been deeply rooted in Torhorst's personal values and life choices since at least as far back as the First World War, but it was only in 1928 that she became a member of the Social Democratic Party (SPD). It was in the same year that she joined the "Freie Lehrergewerkschaft Deutschlands" / FLGD, a teachers' trades union committed to socialist principals. (Note: In 1929 the FLGD was renamed as the "Allgemeine Freie Lehrergewerkschaft Deutschlands" / AFLD. Sources use both names interchangeably.) There are indications that within the SPD, as a left-wing member of the party, she often found herself out of sympathy with the party leadership.

Between 1929 and 1933, Marie Torhorst taught and worked as a "Studienrätin" (loosely, "student counsellor") at the Karl Marx School which had been set up in 1921 in Berlin-Neukölln by the education pioneer Fritz Karsen, and then progressively expanded under Karsen's direction during the years that followed. There was much about the school which was considered innovative at the time. In 1929 Karsen took the bold step of turning it into a "Gesamtschule" (loosely, "comprehensive school"), intended to educate children displaying the widest possible range of abilities. Another appealing feature for Torhorst was an underpinning philosophy which insisted that academically talented working class children should have the same opportunities as the children of more prosperous and/or well educated parents to pass the "Abitur" (secondary school final exam). The significance of the "Abitur" in Germany was (and is) that passing it opens the way to university-level education. Torhorst's four years at the school included, in 1932, a six month study trip to the Soviet Union. Her half year in the Soviet Union left a lasting impression.

The early 1930s were marked by an intensification of Germany's political polarisation. In the Reichstag (parliament) this was reflected in political deadlock. In January 1933 the Hitler government took power and rapidly transformed Germany into a one-party dictatorship. A progressive school in a traditionally left-wing district of Berlin named in honour of Karl Marx was, unsurprisingly, high on the National Socialist hate list. Bernhard Rust was installed as acting Prussian Minister for the Arts and Education on 4 February 1933 (following the dismissal of his predecessor in the office), and on 21 February 1933 Rust dismissed Karsen from the headship of his own school. The teaching staff were dismissed, and when the school reopened later that year it was with a new name, a new set of teachers, and a large swastika flag hanging in the main hall. Karsen emigrated. Marie Torhorst's teaching career was evidently over.

=== Twelve years of Hitler ===
As soon as Hitler took power Marie's older sister, Adelheid, emigrated to the Netherlands and stayed there for the next twelve years. In 1934 she embarked on a six month marriage of convenience with a man called Jacob Jacobs. Her own resulting change of name, from Adelheid Torhorst to Adelheid Jacobs, turned out to have been prescient. After the German army invaded the Netherlands in 1940, her new name protected her from Nazi persecution. The two sisters had always been close, both politically engaged, both teachers, both unmarried and childless. But Marie Torhorst chose a different course and stayed in Germany. As far as her public self was concerned, hr first job after losing her teaching position was as a catering assistant. She later found a job as an appointments administrator at the Berlin University Hygiene Institute, and another as a typist in the travel office correspondence section of an American Express (AMEXCO) branch. She was, in addition, entitled to receive a pension in respect of the six years during which she had worked as head of a private business school in Bremen between 1923 and 1929, but this pension was payable by the "Reichsversicherungsanstalt", a government agency. It was not paid to her. According to her own understanding set out in a letter to a friend at the time, changes to the law implemented in 1934/35 meant that she was unable to litigate the matter. In addition to her day jobs, Torhorst gave every sign of being part of the new social order emerging in Germany. Between 1935 and 1940 she was a registered member both of the German Labour Front and of the German Red Cross.

According to her own detailed, albeit largely uncorroborated, records she was also a member of other organisations that operated, as far as possible, out of the sight of the homeland security. As soon as she lost her teaching job at beginning of 1933 she became an activist member of "Parole", a locally based resistance group in Berlin-Neukölln. In this group, together with former pupils from the progressive school at which she had taught between 1929 and 1933, she produced an underground anti-government newspaper, also called "Parole". There are indications that she was also involved in underground political discussion groups, and in smuggling out information about conditions in Germany to the exiled Communist Party leadership groups that had ended up after 1933 in Paris, Prague and Moscow, using her communications with her sister in the Netherlands as a conduit.

The authorities seem to have known (or suspected) that the teachers who had lost their jobs when the Karl Marx School in Neukölln had been taken over would (or might) have kept in touch and formed some sort of a resistance organisation. Marie Torhorst was first called in for questioning by the Gestapo in 1937. She was accused of undertaking political work for the (by now illegal) SPD, but she was able to refute the accusation and was released, presumably "for lack of evidence". War broke out in September 1939. Within Germany, government persecution of political opponents and of Jews intensified progressively till the Shoah reached its brutish nadir in 1942. During this time Marie Torhorst concealed one of her former pupils and his mother, also providing the two of them with food. The young man was in particular danger from the government, since he was both Jewish and a Communist. At some point during 1943 someone informed the authorities of the situation. Sources are silent over what happened to the people she had been hiding, but Marie Torhorst herself was detained and taken to the "Hallendorf labour camp" by Watenstedt, near Braunschweig. Given the personal network that she would have acquired during her teaching career, and given her strong political and social opinions, it is likely that Torhorst will have responded to many opportunities to help victims and potential victims of government persecution between 1933 and 1945, and commentators bemoan the lack of relevant research undertaken on the details of resistance activism in Berlin and other German cities. However, many of the actions involved will have depended on maximum secrecy to have been effective, and it therefore seems likely that most of the details will remain unknown.

Before the war ended Torhorst had been released from the labour camp and returned to Berlin. Here she returned to the job in the archives department job with the "Deutsche Gesellschaft für Betriebswirtschaft" (loosely, "German Society for Business Administration") in which she had already been employed between 1939 and her arrest in 1943. During the final months of the war she was also involved in looking after German prisoners of War under the auspices of the "Reichsgruppe Handwerk" (a government backed craftworkers' organisation).

=== 1945 and new beginnings ===
The end of the war in May 1945 marked an end to the Hitler nightmare and new beginnings for millions of Germans. There were choices to be made. The western two thirds of Germany had ended up divided into four military occupation zones, administered respectively by the British, the Americans, the French and the Soviets. The region surrounding Berlin, along with the ruins and rubble comprising eastern part of the city itself, were administered as the Soviet occupation zone. Torhorst had spent the Hitler years based in Berlin and she now made her choice: she joined the (no longer outlawed) Communist Party in or before January 1946.

She was actively engaged in various education related functions from the middle part of 1945. Between August 1945 and July 1946 she took charge at the department in charge of teacher training for the education department of Greater Berlin. In April 1946 a new political party was created in the Soviet occupation zone by means of a contentious political merger between the Communist Party and the Social Democratic Party. It is probable that the architects of this arrangement intended that it should take effect across all four occupation zones, but as matters turned out the Socialist Unity Party ("Sozialistische Einheitspartei Deutschlands" / SED) never gained traction outside the Soviet zone. Nevertheless, in East Berlin Marie Torhorst was one of hundreds of thousands of Communist Party members who lost no time in signing their party memberships over to what became, over the next few years, the ruling party in a new kind of German one-party dictatorship. The party unification congress of April 1946 also saw a widespread transfer of political powers over various aspects of daily life, including education, to the control of the new Party. Marie Torhorst meanwhile emerged as a true believer in the new order. She saw herself as an intellectual-worker, determined to support the building of a new Germany, truly socialist in spirit and vision. After twelve years of Hitler, actions for the creation of an antifascist future must be genuine, and not just a matter for empty rhetoric. The political beliefs which she had developed and by which she had lived under the German Republic before 1933 provided a sound basis on which, under the Soviet military administration, it would be possible develop and apply her ideas for the education system. It now became apparent just how much she had been impressed by Soviet education during her six month study visit to Moscow in 1932. Towards the end of 1946 she held a meeting with Fritz Karsen, the education pioneer at whose school she had worked as a teacher between 1929 and 1933. He was back in (west) Berlin, now working for the US military administration as an education officer. When he asked Torhorst how it could be possible to work only "under Russian pressure", she replied that she had never felt "so free and happy". Now she found she could "join in with the creation of everything that she had always strived to achieve as a teacher, without having to make any of those fundamental comprises".

=== Nation building ===
Between May 1945 and October 1949 the Soviet occupation zone underwent a carefully choreographed nation building programme based on plans many of which had, as it turned out, been devised in some detail in Moscow between 1941 and 1945 by the men who now held the levers of power (subject to Soviet supervision). On 29 May 1947 Torhorst was chosen to serve as "Minister for People's Education" in the state of Thuringia. It was a remarkable development. The recently launched women's weekly magazine "Die Frau von heute" carried her portrait on its front page, accompanied by the headline "Frauen als Minister ..... [habe] Deutschland noch nicht gesehen" (loosely, "Women as ministers .... a new experience for Germany" There was a brief article spelling out that her appointment was justified by "long years of specialist knowledge", but also acknowledging that "as a woman she ... [would be] exposed to exceptional levels of criticism". Nevertheless, "for all the women in the east" the appointment represented a melting away of the former indifference over women being able to determine their own futures. Even though it had in the past been the case that "a few thousand of her gender-comrades, who came from the more favourably positioned classes, found their way into some of the higher professions, such as medicine, academic life or equivalent levels in public service", Torhorst's appointment as a minister showed that "the whole situation for the female gender has changed fundamentally, since their equality of value and equality of entitlement with men" was officially recognised, and thereby their "gender-subservience" had been done away with.

Torhorst herself also used the press to share with comrades some of her ambitions for her new role. These included the necessity "to bring an end to the still major differences between urban and rural schooling provision". She also shared her opinion that there was "still much more to be done to lay down a genuinely democratic basis for the development of a highly qualified and progressive German intelligentsia". Indispensable to that ambition was "a substantial increase in the proportion of university students with working class backgrounds". She would therefore make it her top priority to ensure that "the treasures of culture and learning do not simply benefit a small number of comrades at the top of society". An interesting insight into her education philosophy as minister comes from a surviving record of a "conversation" that Torhorst held with an American delegation on 27 June 1947, shortly after her appointment to ministerial office: "The most important work ... would be implementation of the law to democratise German schools". In this connection "Unity schools must be implemented in the Soviet zone". (Note: "Einheitsschule" (loosely "Unity Schools") is the term used in Germany for "one-size fits all secondary schools", driven by the ideals and impulses that led to the introduction of equivalent government mandated "Comprehensive schools" in most of England and Wales during the 1960s and 1970s. Although such schools have become mainstream across much of Europe, Germany continues to prefer to allocate children to separate schools according to perceived academic ability. In East German, during the 1950s, it was believed that such differentiation according to talent and motivation amounted to separating children according to the income and education levels of their parents, however. For Marie Torhorst that would have run completely contrary to socialist principals.)

There was a strong, if ill-defined, expectation on both sides of what would become known as the "inner German border" that the four military occupation zones of Germany would at some stage be rehabilitated and unified into a single post-fascist state, but visions of how such a state would be governed differed starkly, especially after 1948. During the twelve month Berlin blockade thoughts of any future German reunification disappeared over the horizon, and in October 1949 the Soviet zone was relaunched as the Soviet sponsored German Democratic Republic (East Germany). It was also during 1949 that Adelheid returned from the Netherlands and moved in with Marie. The two sisters, still unmarried, childless, and still – in their different ways – deeply engaged in the politics of education, made their home together in Weimar, which till 1952 was the seat of the state government for Thuringia. (Note: The state level tier of government was abolished in East Germany in 1952. The "new federal states" ("neue Bundesländer") were revived only in 1990.) In 1950 Marie Torhorst lost her position as Thuringian Minister for People's Education. Significantly Isolde Oschmann, her successor, appointed only in 1951, was another woman. Isolde Oschmann was a former Kindergarten teacher who turned out to be very much less of a hands-on education minister that Torhorst had been: her footprint on East German history remained slight despite her having held ministerial office for more than a year. It remains unclear why Marie Torhorst was replaced in the role. There is no very obvious indication from her subsequent public career that she was among those who fell out of favour with the party leadership at this time.

=== Ex-minister ===
Torhorst then served, briefly during 1951/52, as political secretary with the East Berlin office of the "Internationale Demokratische Frauenföderation" (IDFF / "Women's International Democratic Federation"). She also accepted an invitation from Paul Wandel, East Germany's Minister for Education, to take over the running of the important "Arts Exhibition of the People's Republic of China" which was held in East Berlin during 1950/51. In 1952 she joined the East German Education Ministry as head of the department for cultural relations with foreign countries, a position she retained till 1957. Between 1958 and 1962 she taught at the (East) German National Pedagogical Institute, where in 1962 she also accepted a professorship. Through the 1950s and early 1960s Torhorst held a number of other, mostly short-term and part-time complementary appointments relating to her educational experience and expertise. Beyond the world of education, she also served between 1957 and 1960 as an honorary deputy president of the "Demokratischer Frauenbund Deutschlands" (DFD / "(East) German Democratic Women's League". After 1964, the year of her seventy-sixth birthday, she continued to engage actively in education related projects and discussions, but now on a free-lance basis.

Marie Torhorst died in East Berlin on 7 May 1989. Despite her considerable age, she was very far from forgotten at the time of her death. There were obituaries both from the East German ministry of Education and from the Central Committee. She had lived out her final years in a special retirement home set aside for "party veterans".

=== Stasi links ===
After reunification it emerged that Marie Torhorst had been a longstanding and active Secret Informant for the Ministry for State security. When the Stasi files were investigated, her earliest surviving report was found to date from 1953. Most Stasi informants produced reports on the daily movements and conversations of their work colleagues and / or family members, but Torhorst had been targeted and recruited after it was noticed, from routine monitoring of her personal letters, that she had excellent contacts with a number of persons of interest on the far side of the "inner German border". No doubt it was considered useful that she was always herself a compulsive writer of long detailed letters to friends and contacts. On account of her links to the East German government she also enjoyed exceptional travel privileges at a time when East Germany was becoming became ever more physically isolated from the west. Those on whom she submitted reports included her cousin, the respected professor of church law Rudolf Smend, the popular historian Wolfgang Leonhardt and the journalist Stephan Grzeskowiak. (Stephan Grzeskowiak was, in addition, one of Torhorst's former pupils from her time as a teacher at the Karl Marx School in Neukölln during the early 1930s and, more recently, had been a party insider with the team surrounding Kurt Schumacher, the recently deceased leader if the SPD in the west. His ongoing links, as a journalist, with SPD politicians in Bonn during the 1950s, 60s and 70s were of particular interest to Torhorst's Stasi handlers.) In 1958 her Stasi handlers marked the seventieth birthday of "GI Sophie" (the codename by which she was identified in the files) with a hamper worth 75 (western) marks, accompanied by a note commending the way in which she had "fulfilled all her assignments in an exemplary manner ... [and showed] a keen of interest in [the Stasi's] work". It does appear that her reports were not just long, but also both detailed and, at times, remarkably "readable" and even "chatty". She was indeed unusual among Stasi informants in her willingness to submit unsolicited advice, for instance concerning books from the west which should probably not be permitted to circulate in East Germany, or ways in which East German radio programmes might more effectively counter the "western propaganda" broadcast by the U.S. backed RIAS (radio station) from West Berlin. After her seventieth birthday a regular "secret collaborative relationship" was deemed no longer appropriate on account of her age, but she continued to receive "official visits" and her advice continued to be solicited, according to the reports of her Stasi handler at the time, Officer Hüther.
