= Eleni Myrivili =

German politician ans anthropologist

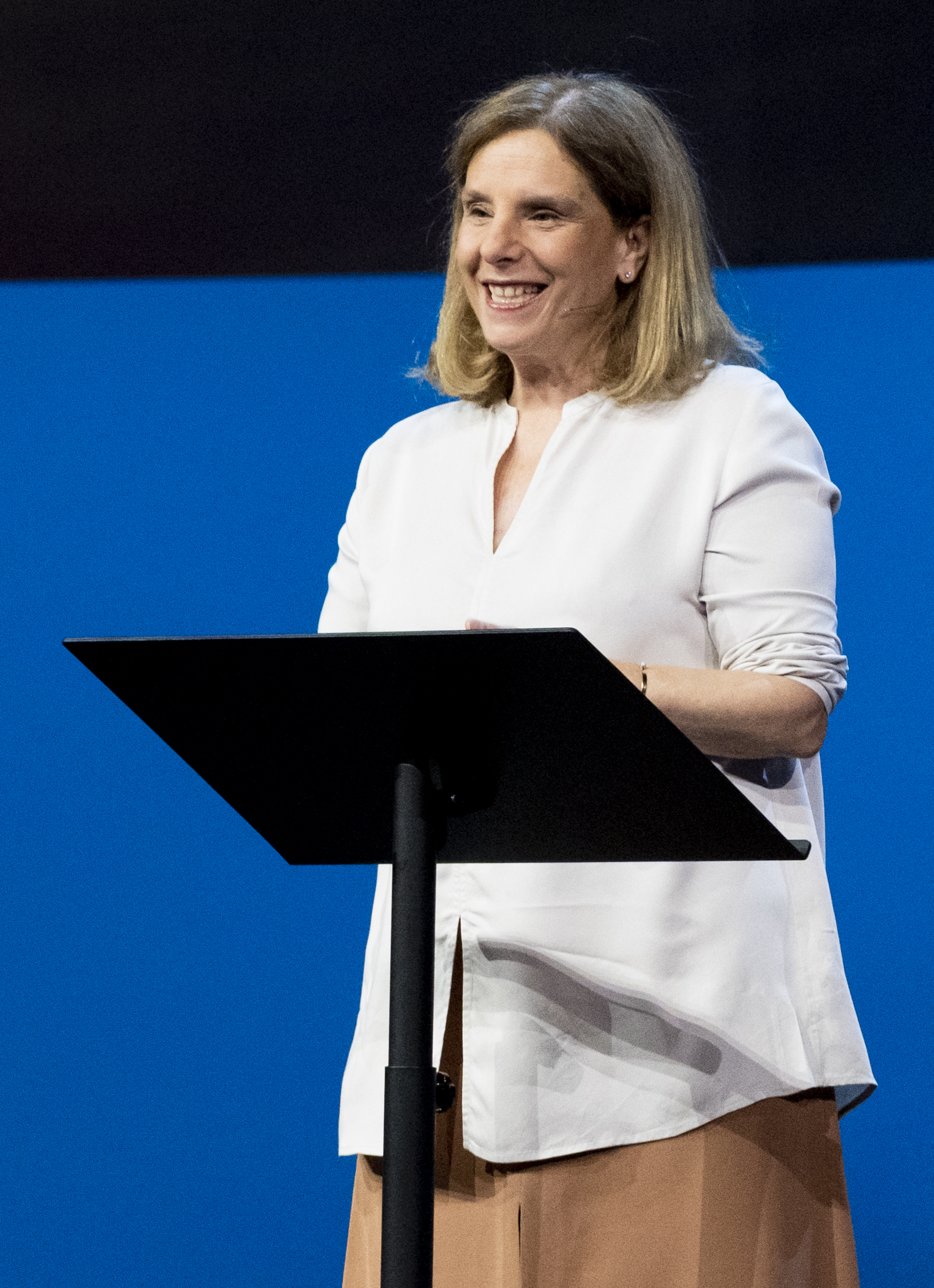
Eleni Myrivili in 2022

Eleni Myrivili (Greek: Ελένη Μυριβήλη) is the United Nations Human Settlements Programme's Chief Heat Officer (CHO), the City of Athens Chief Resilience Officer, a member of the European Union Mission Board for Adaptation to Climate Change Mission, a Nonresident Senior Fellow at the Adrienne Arsht – Rockefeller Foundation Resilience Center at the Atlantic Council, a tenured assistant professor at the Department of Cultural Technology & Communications at the University of the Aegean, and a former Loeb Fellow at the Harvard Graduate School of Design.

Myrivili received her Ph.D. from Columbia University's Department of Anthropology in 2004.
