= Jiang Ximing =

Chinese zoologist and politician (1913 – 1990)

- Born: September 20, 1913; Guanyun, Jiangsu, China
- Died: 1990
- Citizenship: Chinese
- Education: LMU Munich, Zhejiang University
- Scientific career
- Fields: Zoology

Jiang Ximing (Chinese: 江希明; 20 September 1913 – 1990) was a Chinese zoologist and politician.

== Life ==
Jiang was born in 1913 in Guanyun County, Jiangsu Province. July 1936, Jiang graduated from the Department of Biology, Zhejiang University. Just after his graduation, Jiang became a lecturer in the same department. In February 1937, Jiang married Xu Ruiyun, who later became the first Chinese woman who had a PhD degree in mathematics.

In May 1937, both Jiang and Xu were rewarded by scholarships that allowed them to study in Germany. In 1940, both received Ph.D.s from the Ludwig-Maximilians-Universität München (LMU), in Biology and in Mathematics.

Jiang went back to China and became a professor in the Department of Biology at Zhejiang University. He later became the director of the department.

After 1949, Jiang served as the vice-president of Zhejiang Normal College (current Zhejiang Normal University), the president of Hangzhou Normal College (different from the current Hangzhou Normal University, the Hangzhou Normal College mentioned here later was merged into the Hangzhou University, and in 1998, Hangzhou University was merged into Zhejiang University). He also served as the vice-president of Hangzhou University and later became an adviser of the university.

Jiang was the vice-president of the China Zoological Society (中国动物学会). He also served twice as the vice-president of the Zhejiang Provincial Chinese People's Political Consultative Conference. In 1984, Jiang became a member of the Chinese Communist Party.
