= Ionian University of Smyrna =

University operated by Greeks in modern-day Turkey

Ionian University
- Ιωνικό Πανεπιστήμιο
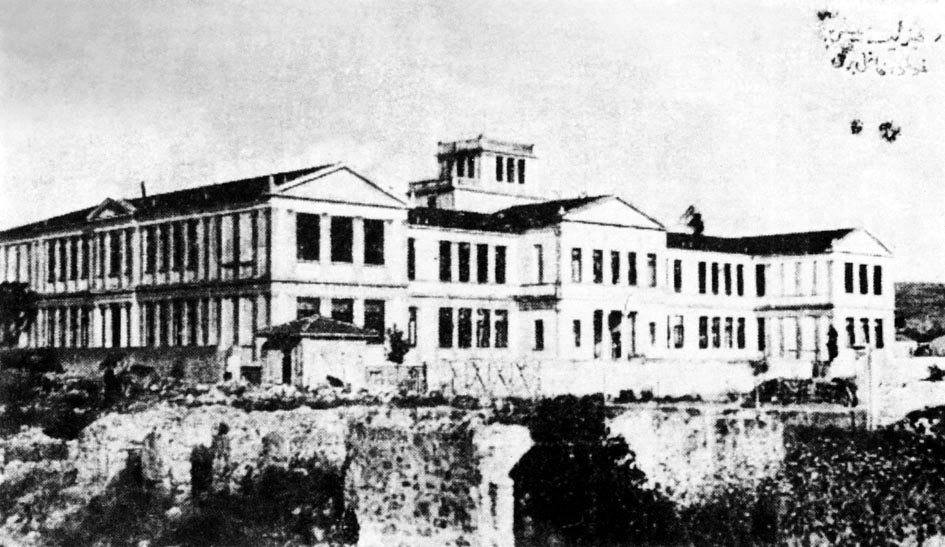
- Motto: Ex Oriente Lux (Out of the Orient, light)
- Type: Public university
- Active: December 1920–September 1922
- Location: Smyrna (modern İzmir), Smyrna Zone (dependency of Greece)

The Ionian University of Smyrna (Greek: Ιωνικό Πανεπιστήμιο της Σμύρνης) was a university established by the local Greek authorities during the Greek occupation of Smyrna (1919–1922), today İzmir, Turkey. The initiative for the organization of the institution was undertaken by the mathematician Constantin Carathéodory. However, the University of Smyrna, the first to be established in the city, never operated due to the Greek defeat in the Greco-Turkish War and the subsequent evacuation in September 1922.

== Background ==
Greek education in Smyrna was already thriving during the Ottoman period. A total of 67 educational institutions were operating in early 20th century thanks to support from the local Greek community, the church as well as from private institutions. The most notable schools in the city were the Homer School for Girls, the Graeco-German Lycee and the Evangelical School. The latter was the most renowned possessing an archaeological museum, a natural science collection and a library.

== Carathéodory's initiative ==
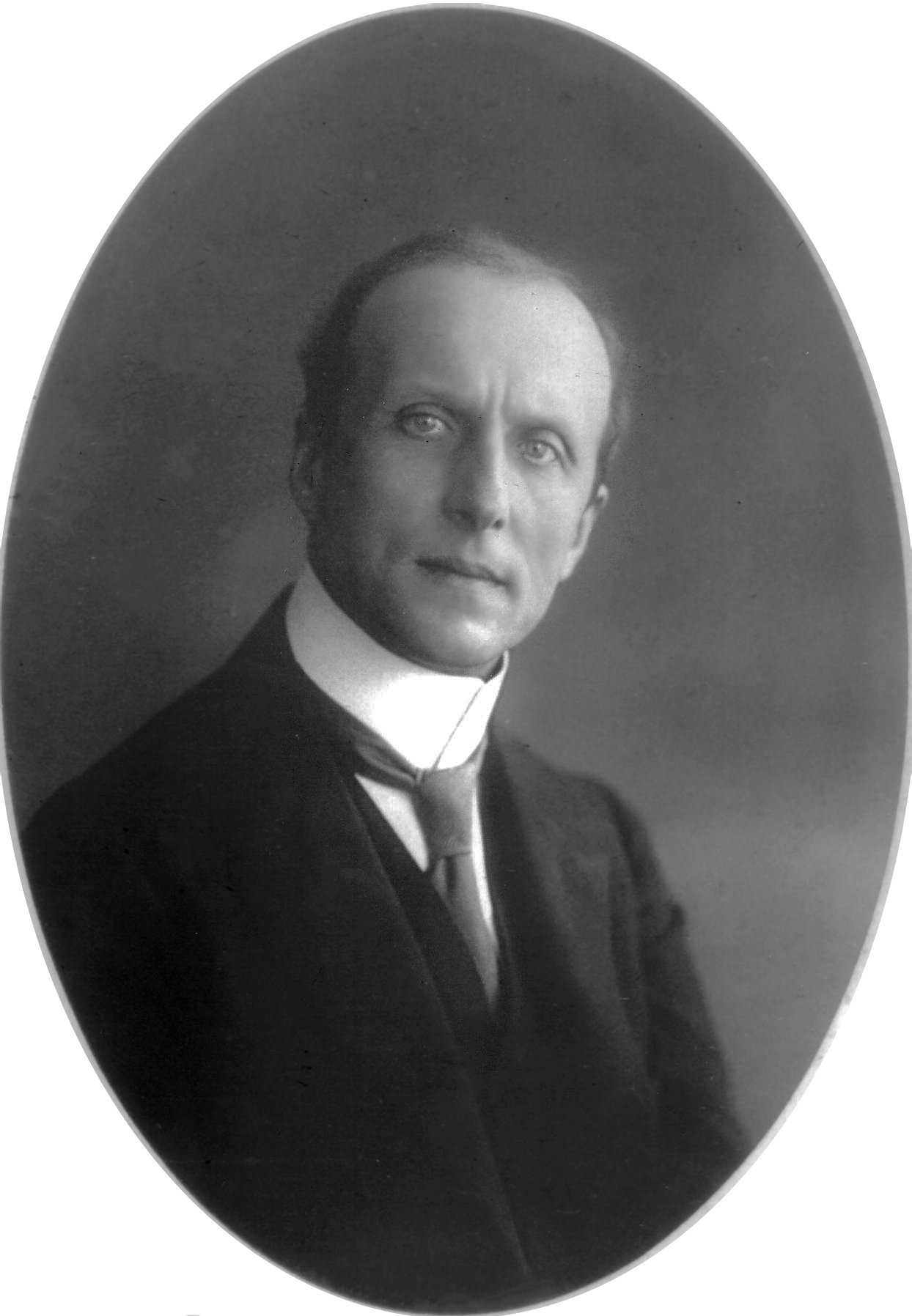
Constantin Carathéodory (1873-1950)

Smyrna came under Greek control, as part of the post World War I political developments, while the creation of a university in the city was one of Greek High Commissioner's, Aristidis Stergiadis, dearest projects. For this purpose, Constantin Carathéodory, mathematician, professor at the University of Göttingen, Germany, and close friend of Albert Einstein, came to Smyrna. He took up the management of the University on the instructions of the Greek government. For the same purpose, in September 1920 Georgios Ioakimoglou, lecturer of Pharmacology at Humboldt University of Berlin, was also called to Smyrna to assist Carathéodory in organising the project and to take full professorship for hygiene and microbiology. On the evening of their arrival in Smyrna, Carathéodory and Ioakeimoglou, discussed with Stergiadis the situation and the measures that should be taken regarding the foundation of the University.

Stergiadis promised to support this initiative and indeed, the Greek administration covered the expenses for the foundation, organization and management and granted them a large building, which was half-erected that time. The foundation of the Ionian University was proclaimed with a High Commissioner's decree, at December 1920. This decree corresponded to the ideas that Carathéodory presented in a memorandum.

== Facilities and schools ==
The building began in 1911 for the School of Union and Progress (İzmir İttihad ve Terakki Mektebi) by the governor of the Aydin Vilayet Mustafa Rahmi Bey. However, its construction was not completed.

The University was to comprise four schools, namely for agriculture and natural sciences, oriental languages, for social and economic sciences and for trade and supervision of construction work. Parallel to the education of specialists in agriculture, the School of Agriculture had the task to organize seminars for landowners and farmers as well as advising them on more efficient cultivation methods; on how to fight plant and animal diseases and to conduct scientific research in its laboratories. It operated in conjunction with a big experimental farm at Tepekoy, near Smyrna, while British historian and correspondent of the Manchester Guardian in Smyrna that time, Arnold J. Toynbee, was very impressed by his visit in the university farm. One of Carathéodory's concerns was also the university library. On May 11, 1921 the High Commissioner's Office agreed to his proposed expenditure of 18,000 Swiss francs for the purchase of the library. Carathéodory organized the library according to the current European standards and thus he initiated cooperation with one of Leipzig’s most prominent book catalog agencies. He also hired specialized technical personnel from Berlin in order to prepare plans for the library’s indoor architecture and detailed designs for the metallic bookshelves.

Greek was the intended language of instruction, in some cases Turkish or other languages would be allowed. Admission to the university was to be open to all, irrespective sex or nationality provided the prerequisites determined through special regulations were met. Additionally, the university would have the right to accept guest students and to award doctorates, diplomas and certificates. The central administration of the institution would be accountable to the General Secretary.

== Evacuation of Smyrna and the fate of the library ==
On the eve of the Greek defeat in Anatolia during the Greco-Turkish War, all the measures necessary for managing the university had been taken. The Institute of Hygiene and the library were scheduled for inauguration in October 10, 1922. However, the university would not be able to open due to developments in the ongoing Greco-Turkish War which ended with the Greek defeat and the evacuation of Asia Minor, in September 1922. Carathéodory managed to transfer the material, which was originally destined for use at the University of Smyrna, to the new Central Library of Athens University.

In 1923, after the Turkish recovery of the city, the building began to be used as the İzmir Teachers' College for Males (İzmir Erkek Muallim Mektebi). In 1936, after the Teachers' College for Males moved to Kızılçullu (It was renamed as "Paradiso" during Greek occupation, now Şirinyer), Buca under the authority of the Village Institutes that was forming at the time, the building was assigned to İzmir Girls' High School).

== Sources ==
- Georgiadou, Maria (2004). Constantin Carathéodory (null ed.). Berlin: Springer. ISBN 978-3-540-20352-0.
