= Prime end =

In mathematics, the prime end compactification is a method to compactify a topological disc (i.e. a simply connected open set in the plane) by adding the boundary circle in an appropriate way.

== Historical notes ==
The concept of prime ends was introduced by Constantin Carathéodory to describe the boundary behavior of conformal maps in the complex plane in geometric terms. The theory has been generalized to more general open sets. The expository paper of Epstein (1981) provides a good account of this theory with complete proofs: it also introduces a definition which make sense in any open set and dimension. Milnor (2006) gives an accessible introduction to prime ends in the context of complex dynamical systems.

== Formal definition ==
The set of prime ends of the domain B is the set of equivalence classes of chains of arcs converging to a point on the boundary of B.

In this way, a point in the boundary may correspond to many points in the prime ends of B, and conversely, many points in the boundary may correspond to a point in the prime ends of B.

== Applications ==
Carathéodory's principal theorem on the correspondence between boundaries under conformal mappings can be expressed as follows:

If ƒ maps the unit disk conformally and one-to-one onto the domain B, it induces a one-to-one mapping between the points on the unit circle and the prime ends of B.
