= University of the Aegean =

Public university in Greece

Coordinates: 39.1°N 26.55°E

- Πανεπιστήμιο Αιγαίου
- Seal of the University of the Aegean (The Ancient Sphinx)
- Type: Public higher education institution
- Established: 1984; 42 years ago
- Affiliations: European University Association (EUA)
- Rector: Dimitrios Papageorgiou
- Academic staff: 466
- Students: 10,000 (2019)
- Undergraduates: 8,000
- Postgraduates: 1,000
- Doctoral students: 605
- Location: Mytilene (main campus), Greece
- Campus: Mytilene, Chios, Karlovasi, Rhodes, Ermoupoli, Myrina
- Colors
- Website: www.aegean.edu/

The University of the Aegean (UAegean; Greek: Πανεπιστήμιο Αιγαίου, Π.ΑΙΓ.) is a public, multi-campus university located in Lesvos, Chios, Samos, Rhodes, Syros and Lemnos, Greece. It was founded on March 20, 1984, by the Presidential Act 83/1984 and its administrative headquarters are located in the town of Mytilene, on the island of Lesvos.

The university today comprises five Schools and 18 Departments offering undergraduate and post-graduate degrees programmes. This growth was based on the administration's belief that its sustainability could only be based on its potential to grow into a substantially large institute, initially in department numbers supporting its educational side and secondly in postgraduate courses in support of its research nature.

The University of the Aegean, like all universities in Greece, is a public university. As such, its educational activities and a small part of its research activities rely upon government funding. Since 2014, the University has been facing severe economic hardship due to austerity policies resulting in minimal state funding.

== Emblem ==
The emblem of the University of the Aegean is the Sphinx.

== Academic profile ==
As described in its mandate, the University of the Aegean is a university which embodies a unique structure which combines campuses across six islands of the Aegean Sea.

There is a student population of approximately 10,000 active students enrolled at the university, 8,200 in undergraduate programmes and 2,000 in Postgraduate programmes with a faculty of over 380.

Furthermore, in 2011, the Teaching and Research Staff numbered 292 people (55 professors, 70 associate professors, 128 assistant professors, and 39 lecturers), the Scientific Teaching Staff numbered 99 and the Special Laboratory Teaching Staff 23 people, supported by 30 members of the Special Technical Laboratory Staff for teaching services and 304 members of administrative staff.

== Faculties and departments ==
The University of the Aegean consists of 6 Schools and 18 Departments that form the five University Units based on six islands of the Aegean Sea – Lesvos, Chios, Rhodes, Samos, Syros and Lemnos. As of 2013, all departments are organised in the five existing Schools – Humanities, Sciences, Business Studies, Social Studies and Environmental Studies.

	Departments
School of Social Sciences (founded 1989) (based in Mytilene, LESVOS)	Social Anthropology and History (founded 1987); Sociology (founded 1999); Cultural technology and Communication (founded 2000); Geography (founded 1994)
School of the Environment (founded 2004) (based in Mytilene, LESVOS)	Environment (founded 1984); Marine Sciences (founded 1999); Food Science and Nutrition (Lemnos) (founded 2009)
School of Business (founded 1997) (based in Chios, CHIOS)	Business Administration (founded 1985); Shipping, Trade and Transport (founded 1998); Tourism Economics and Management (founded 2017)
School of Engineering (founded 2017) (based in Ermoupoli, SYROS)	Information and Communication Systems Engineering (Samos) (founded 1997); Financial and Management Engineering (Chios) (founded 2000); Product and Systems design Engineering (Syros) (founded 2000)
School of Sciences (founded 1997) (based in Karlovassi, SAMOS)	Mathematics (founded 1987); Statistics and Actuarial-Financial Mathematics (founded 2000)
School of Humanities (founded 1997) (based in Rhodes, RHODES)	Primary Education (founded 1986); Preschool Education Sciences and Educational Design (founded 1987); Mediterranean Studies: Archaeology, Linguistics, International Relations (founded 1999)

=== "ATHENA" Reform Plan for Higher Education ===
A university report presented by the Chancellor in the Greek parliament in late 2011 describes the current challenges faced by the institution due to economic hardship and the dispersion of its academic units in islands, which increases operational costs and adds considerable stress in the educational process.

The Ministry of Education aimed to reform all Higher Education programmes in 2013 with the "ATHENA" Plan.

The university's Senate issued a formal response to the Ministry of Education's proposed plan in 2013.

== Academic evaluation ==
The University is ranked 801st–1000th in The Times Higher Education (THE) annual list.

=== HQA evaluation ===
An external evaluation of all academic departments in Greek universities was conducted by the Hellenic Quality Assurance and Accreditation Agency (HQA) in 2012-2015.

In 2015, the University of the Aegean was evaluated by the Hellenic Quality Assurance and Accreditation Agency (HQAA) and received an overall institutional evaluation of "worthy of merit."

=== Reputation ===
The university is one of the thirty public higher education institutions in Greece. Students are awarded degrees which fully comply with the ECTS standard, which enables them to undertake international study programmes. During the evaluation of the university by the European University Association in 2005, it was acknowledged that at the time the university had an "impressive" research output.

The evaluation also highlights the university's serious shortcomings "while it is undoubtedly the case that all universities are handicapped by the effects of this State interference, the impact at the University of the Aegean is particularly great because of its multi-island structure. It was also apparent that there are insufficient permanent staff overall, and indeed that many of the permanent academic staff are not in a position where they are able to concentrate full-time on their work within the university. The average amount of academic staff travel raises some serious concerns. Indeed all the academic staff are obliged to make difficult choices in their professional and personal lives which entail either accepting a lower standard of living in order to remain on the islands, or juggling life between a city and islands. Many of the staff described only minimal cooperation with colleagues within departments, and even less with those from other departments".

Despite the "impressive output" the lack of strategic design and effective prioritisation in research activities was evident at the time, the notable remark being that "research seems to be driven by the interests of individual academics, and more by accident than institutional design will it address priority issues for the institution or region".

In 2007 a postgraduate programme in Classical Homeopathy (Holistic Alternative Therapeutic Systems) was established in the university of the Aegean's unit in Syros, which was discontinued in 2013.

Research Rankings Summary
Institution	Position
European Research Ranking	21st (2014) in Greece

== History ==
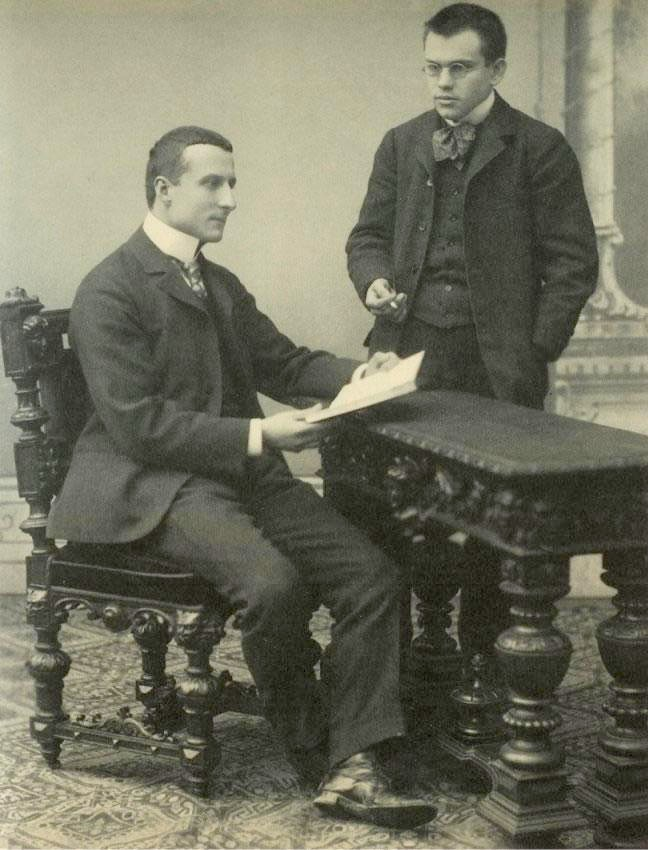
Constantin Carathéodory (left) with Hungarian mathematician Lipót Fejér (1880–1959) (standing to the right)

The first department to operate, in the academic year 1984-85, was the department of Business Administration, on the island of Chios. In the following year, the Department of Primary School Education, in Rhodes, and the Postgraduate Course on Environmental Studies began operating. At the end of the first five years of operation, the University comprised 7 departments and 1 postgraduate course, "however, in 1997 a remarkable development was initiated by exploiting available [european] funding opportunities".

The university was officially founded in 1984, although its historical roots date back to the early 1920s, to the Ionian University of Smyrna (Ex Oriente Lux, Light from the East) which while established never operated.

The foundations of the University of the Aegean date back to October 1918, when Greece had expanded its geographic borders to the wider Smyrna area after World War I. At the time, National and Kapodistrian University of Athens was the only University in Greece.

Professor Constantin Carathéodory who was a professor at the University of Berlin at the time proposed the establishment of a new University – the difficulties regarding the establishment of a Greek university in Constantinople led him to consider three other cities: Thessaloniki, Chios and Smyrna. Despite the political turbulence of the era over the city of Smyrna, the famous mathematician constructed a "plan for the creation of a new University in Greece", named “Ionian University” on 20 October 1919.

The city of Smyrna in Asia Minor was one of the cultural centres of the Ionian civilisation closely associated with Ancient Greek philosophy.

Consequently, the Greek government decided to materialize Carathéodory's vision and establish the Ionian University, based in Smyrna (today's city of İzmir, Turkey) on 1 December 1920. Constantin Carathéodory was the first dean of the university. However, the Ionian University stopped its operations due to the Great Fire of Smyrna in 1922. The new Greek University in the broader area of the Southeast Mediterranean region, as originally envisioned by Carathéodory, finally materialised with the establishment of the Aristotle University of Thessaloniki in 1925.

=== Expansion plans ===
In 2026, the University launched its first bachelor's program taught in English, BA in Eastern Mediterranean Studies. Archaeology, History, Culture.

The Department of Tourism Economics and Management started its operation in 2017, admitting its first students in October 2017.

During the fall semester of 2012 a number of administrative employees were laid off as a result of downsizing policy in the public sector. The main administrative body issued an official statement of protest.

== Research ==
Permanent Chairs and general research staff amount to approximately 400, supported by a further 100 scientific teaching staff and 53 teaching assistants. There is also a further 304 members of administrative and student affairs staff.

Every year the university offers e-Learning courses.

=== Summer schools ===
Since 2012, the university organises international Summer Schools in islands in the Aegean Archipelago within the fields of Sciences, Humanities, Environmental Sciences and Business, with interdisciplinary partnerships between schools.

=== Academic affiliations ===
The university has established academic relationships with research institutions and other universities. The university also participates in the Erasmus+ EU programme for education, training, youth and sport.

- The Natural History Museum of the Lesvos Petrified Forest.
- The Hellenic Centre for Marine Research (HCMR).
- The Aegean Institute of the Law of the Sea and Maritime Law.
- The Research and Training Institute of the East Aegean (INEAG).

== Notable personalities ==
- Renee Hirschon, former Chair of the Department of Social Anthropology; currently a research affiliate at the University of Oxford
- Eleni Myrivili, assistant professor at the Department of Cultural Technology & Communications, and the United Nations Human Settlements Programme's Chief Heat Officer

== Library ==
The University of Aegean library was founded in 1984 and it has ever since experienced modernization and ample development of its IT infrastructure, partly financed by EU programmes.

The library comprises more than 100,000 book titles, and more than 1,000 printed academic journal titles covering areas of Economics, International and European Economic Studies, Business Administration, Management Science and Marketing, Informatics, Statistics, Accounting and Finance, and Management and Technology.

== Student communities ==
There are several academic, cultural and athletic groups active in all islands/university units.

- AIESEC Aegean – Branch of AIESEC Greece, based in Chios island.
- IEEE Student Branch University of Aegean – Student Branch of IEEE Greece (Region 8), established in 2000, based in Samos island.

== See also ==
- Universities in Greece, a list of public Universities offering higher education in Greece.
- List of research institutes in Greece
- European Higher Education Area
- University of Crete, a Greek university situated in Crete, established in 1973.
- Technical University of Crete, a Greek engineering university (Polytechnic) also situated in Crete, established in 1977.
- Aristotle University of Thessaloniki, the largest university in the Balkans, established in 1925.
- Ionian University, a university located in the city of Corfu, established in 1984, in recognition of the island's contribution to higher education in Greece as the seat of Ionian Academy, the first Greek academic institution established in modern times (1844).
- University of the South Pacific, another university whose departments are distributed across multiple islands.
- University of the West Indies, another university whose campuses are distributed across multiple island countries.
- Study in Greece – Official portal for studies in Greece (in Greek and English)
- Hellenic Academic Libraries Link (HEAL-Link) (in Greek and English)
- Kallipos (e-books Greek academic publishing) (in Greek and English)
- Greek Research and Technology Network (GRNET) (in Greek and English)
- Ege University, similarly named university in Turkey
- Open access in Greece
