= Grundlehren der mathematischen Wissenschaften =

Series of advanced mathematics textbooks

Grundlehren der mathematischen Wissenschaften (ISSN: 0072-7830) is a series of advanced textbooks in mathematics published by Springer-Verlag. The series is well-known for its solid yellow covers, and hence the nicknames "yellow series" and "yellow peril". According to Springer, the original objective of the Grundlehren was to lead readers to the principal results and to recent research questions in a single relatively elementary and accessible book, as exemplified by van der Waerden's Moderne Algebra (Vols 33,34) and the two volumes of Courant and Hilbert Methoden der mathematischen Physik (Vols 12, 48). The volumes were originally in German, but gradually transitioned to English, starting with volume 67, "Handbook of Elliptic Integrals for Engineers and Scientists" in 1954.

== History ==
During World War I the German mathematician Richard Courant conceived the idea for a new mathematics textbook series, oriented toward the needs of university teaching and taking up modern currents in mathematics. Courant succeeded in recruiting three well-known German mathematicians, Wilhelm Blaschke, Carl Runge, and Max Born as editors for the series. Before World War I, the Leipzig publisher B. G. Teubner had been the undisputed leader in mathematics publishing, both in the number of titles published and in the reputation of its authors. During the war, that firm lost interest in the mathematics field, and Springer-Verlag stepped in, eventually becoming the premier publisher of mathematics in Germany. As part of that process, Springer agreed to become the publisher of Courant's new series, which was named Grundlehren der mathematischen Wissenschaften. Courant and his editors signed a contract with Springer on November 28, 1918. The first volume, published in 1921, was Vorlesungen über Differentialgeometrie und Geometrische Grundlagen von Einsteins Relativitätstheorie, by Blaschke.

== Series list ==
Source: de:Grundlehren der mathematischen Wissenschaften

1. Wilhelm Blaschke: Vorlesungen über Differentialgeometrie und Geometrische Grundlagen von Einsteins Relativitätstheorie I: Elementare Differentialgeometrie. 1921 (with an appendix by Kurt Reidemeister)
2. Konrad Knopp: Theorie und Anwendungen der Unendlichen Reihen. 1922
3. Adolf Hurwitz, Richard Courant: Vorlesungen über Allgemeine Funktionentheorie und Elliptische Funktionen. 1922 (Vorlesung von Hurwitz, Zusatz Geometrische Funktionentheorie von Courant)
4. Erwin Madelung: Die Mathematischen Hilfsmittel des Physikers. 1922
5. Andreas Speiser: Die Theorie der Gruppen von endlicher Ordnung: mit Anwendungen auf algebraische Zahlen und Gleichungen, sowie auf die Kristallographie. 1923
6. Ludwig Bieberbach: Theorie der Differentialgleichungen: Vorlesungen aus dem Gesamtgebiet der gewöhnlichen und der partiellen Differentialgleichungen.1923
7. Wilhelm Blaschke: Vorlesungen Über Differentialgeometrie und Geometrische Grundlagen von Einsteins Relativitätstheorie II: Affine Differentialgeometrie. 1923
8. Béla Kerékjártó: Vorlesungen über Topologie 1. 1923
9. Abraham Fraenkel: Einführung in die Mengenlehre. 1923
10. Jan Schouten: Der Ricci-Kalkül. 1924
11. Carl Runge, Hermann König: Vorlesungen über Numerisches Rechnen. 1924
12. Richard Courant, David Hilbert: Methoden der mathematischen Physik I. 1924
13. Niels Erik Nörlund: Vorlesungen über Differenzenrechnung. 1924
14. Felix Klein: Elementarmathematik vom höheren Standpunk aus I: Arithmetik, Algebra, Analysis. 1924 (edited by Ernst Hellinger und Fr. Seyfarth; die erste Auflage erschien bei Teubner 1911)
15. Felix Klein: Elementarmathematik vom höheren Standpunk aus II: Geometrie. 1925 (edited by Hellinger, Zusätze Seyfarth)
16. Felix Klein: Elementarmathematik vom höheren Standpunk aus III: Präzisions- und Approximationsmathematik. 1925 (edited by C. H. Müller, Zusätze Seyfarth)
17. Edmund Taylor Whittaker: Analytische Dynamik der Punkte und Starren Körper. 1924
18. Arthur Eddington: Relativitätstheorie in Mathematischer Behandlung. 1925
19. George Pólya, Gábor Szegő: Aufgaben und Lehrsätze aus der Analysis II
20. George Pólya, Gábor Szegő: Aufgaben und Lehrsätze aus der Analysis I. 1925
21. Arthur Schoenflies: Einführung in die Analytische Geometrie der Ebene und des Raumes. 1925
22. Felix Klein: Vorlesungen über höhere Geometrie. (edited by Wilhelm Blaschke)
23. Moritz Pasch: Vorlesungen über neuere Geometrie. 1926
24. Felix Klein: Vorlesungen über die Entwicklung der Mathematik im 19. Jahrhundert, I. 1926 (bearbeitet von Otto Neugebauer, Richard Courant)
25. Felix Klein: Vorlesungen über die Entwicklung der Mathematik im 19. Jahrhundert, II (Die Grundbegriffe der Invariantentheorie und ihr Eindringen in die mathematische Physik). 1927
26. Felix Klein: Vorlesungen über nicht-euklidische Geometrie. 1928 (edited by Walther Rosemann)
27. David Hilbert, Wilhelm Ackermann: Grundzüge der Theoretischen Logik. 1928
28. Tullio Levi-Civita: Der absolute Differentialkalkül und seine Anwendungen in Geometrie und Physik. 1928
29. Wilhelm Blaschke: Vorlesungen über Differentialgeometrie und Geometrische Grundlagen von Einsteins Relativitätstheorie III: Differentialgeometrie der Kreise und Kugeln. 1929
30. Leon Lichtenstein: Grundlagen der Hydromechanik. 1929
31. Oliver Kellogg: Foundations of Potential Theory. 1929
32. Kurt Reidemeister: Vorlesungen über Grundlagen der Geometrie. 1930
33. Bartel Leendert van der Waerden: Moderne Algebra. Unter Benutzung von Vorlesungen von Emil Artin und Emmy Noether. Band 1, 1930
34. Bartel Leendert van der Waerden: Moderne Algebra. Band 2, 1931
35. Max Herzberger: Strahlenoptik. 1931
36. Bartel Leendert van der Waerden: Die gruppentheoretische Methode in der Quantenmechanik. 1932
37. David Hilbert, Stefan Cohn-Vossen: Anschauliche Geometrie. 1932
38. John von Neumann: Mathematische Grundlagen der Quantenmechanik. 1932
39. Felix Klein: Vorlesungen über die hypergeometrische Funktion. 1933
40. David Hilbert, Paul Bernays: Grundlagen der Mathematik. Band 1, 1934
41. Ernst Steinitz: Vorlesungen über die Theorie der Polyeder unter Einschluss der Elemente der Topologie. (Hrsg. Hans Rademacher), 1934
42. Christian Juel: Vorlesungen über projektive Geometrie mit besonderer Berücksichtigung der v. Staudtschen Imaginärtheorie. 1934
43. Otto Neugebauer: Vorlesungen über Geschichte der antiken mathematischen Wissenschaften. 1934
44. Jakob Nielsen: Vorlesungen über elementare Mechanik. 1935
45. Pawel Alexandrow, Heinz Hopf: Topologie I. 1935
46. Rolf Nevanlinna: Eindeutige analytische Funktionen. 1936
47. Gustav Doetsch: Theorie und Anwendungen der Laplace-Transformation. 1937
48. Richard Courant, David Hilbert: Methoden der mathematischen Physik. Band 2, 1937
49. Wilhelm Blaschke, Gerrit Bol: Geometrie der Gewebe: topologische Fragen der Differentialgeometrie. 1938
50. David Hilbert, Paul Bernays: Grundlagen der Mathematik. Band 2, 1939
51. Bartel Leendert van der Waerden: Einführung in die algebraische Geometrie. 1939
52. Wilhelm Magnus, Fritz Oberhettinger: Formeln und Sätze für die speziellen Funktionen der mathematischen Physik. 1943
53. Siegfried Flügge: Rechenmethoden der Quantentheorie I. 1947
54. Gustav Doetsch: Tabellen zur Laplace-Transformation und Anleitung zum Gebrauch. 1947
55. Wilhelm Magnus, Fritz Oberhettinger: Anwendung der elliptischen Funktionen in Physik und Technik. 1949
56. Otto Toeplitz: Die Entwicklung der Infinitesimalrechnung: eine Einleitung in die Infinitesimalrechnung nach der genetischen Methode. 1949
57. Georg Hamel: Theoretische Mechanik. 1949
58. Wilhelm Blaschke, Hans Reichardt: Einführung in die Differentialgeometrie. 1950
59. Helmut Hasse: Vorlesungen über Zahlentheorie. 1950
60. Lothar Collatz: Numerische Behandlung von Differentialgleichungen. 1951
61. Wilhelm Maak: Fastperiodische Funktionen. 1951, 2. Auflage 1967
62. Robert Sauer: Anfangswertprobleme bei partiellen Differentialgleichungen. 1952
63. Martin Eichler: Quadratische Formen und Orthogonale Gruppen. 1952
64. Rolf Nevanlinna: Uniformisierung. 1953
65. László Fejes Tóth: Lagerungen in der Ebene, auf der Kugel und im Raum. 1953
66. Ludwig Bieberbach: Theorie der gewöhnlichen Differentialgleichungen: auf funktionentheoretischer Grundlage dargestellt. 1953
67. Paul F. Byrd, Morris D. Friedman: Handbook of Elliptic Integrals for Engineers and Scientists. 1954
68. Georg Aumann: Reelle Funktionen. 1954
69. Arnold Schmidt: Mathematische Gesetze der Logik I, Vorlesungen über Aussagenlogik.
70. Günther Ludwig: Die Grundlagen der Quantenmechanik. 1954
71. Josef Meixner, Friedrich Wilhelm Schäfke: Mathieusche Funktionen und Sphäroidfunktionen mit Anwendungen auf physikalische und technische Probleme. 1954
72. Georg Nöbeling: Grundlagen der analytischen Topologie. 1954
73. Hans Hermes: Einführung in die Verbandstheorie. 1955
74. Hermann Boerner: Darstellungen von Gruppen: mit Berücksichtigung der Bedürfnisse der modernen Physik. 1955
75. Tibor Radó, Paul V. Reichelderfer: Continuous Transformations in Analysis, with an Introduction to Algebraic Topology. 1955
76. Francesco Tricomi: Vorlesungen über Orthogonalreihen. 1955
77. Heinrich Behnke, Friedrich Sommer: Theorie der Funktionen einer komplexen Veränderlichen. 1955
78. Paul Lorenzen: Einführung in die Operative Logik und Mathematik. 1955
79. Walter Saxer: Versicherungsmathematik I. 1955
80. Günter Pickert: Projektive Ebenen. 1955
81. Theodor Schneider: Einführung in die transzendenten Zahlen. 1956
82. Wilhelm Specht: Gruppentheorie. 1956
83. Ludwig Bieberbach: Einführung in die Theorie der Differentialgleichungen im reellen Gebiet. 1956
84. Fabio Conforto: Abelsche Funktionen und Algebraische Geometrie. 1956 (edited by Wolfgang Gröbner)
85. Carl Ludwig Siegel: Vorlesungen über Himmelsmechanik. 1956
86. Hans Richter: Wahrscheinlichkeitstheorie. 1956
87. Bartel Leendert van der Waerden: Mathematische Statistik. 1957
88. Claus Müller: Grundprobleme der mathematischen Theorie der elektromagnetischen Schwingungen. 1957
89. Albert Pfluger: Theorie der Riemannschen Flächen. 1957
90. Fritz Oberhettinger: Tabellen zur Fourier-Transformation. 1957
91. Karl Prachar: Primzahlverteilung. 1957
92. Fritz Rehbock: Darstellende Geometrie. 1957
93. Hugo Hadwiger: Vorlesungen über Inhalt, Fläche und Isoperimetrie. 1957
94. Paul Funk: Variationsrechnung und ihre Anwendung in Physik und Technik. 1962
95. Fumitomo Maeda: Kontinuierliche Geometrien. 1958
96. Friedrich Bachmann: Aufbau der Geometrie auf dem Spiegelungsbegriff. 1959
97. Werner H. Greub: Lineare Algebra. 1958
98. Walter Saxer: Versicherungsmathematik. Teil 2, 1958
99. John Cassels: An Introduction to the Geometry of Numbers. 1959
100. Werner von Koppenfels, Friedemann Stallmann: Praxis der konformen Abbildung. 1959
101. Hanno Rund: The Differential Geometry of Finsler Spaces. 1959
102. Rolf Nevanlinna, Frithiof Nevanlinna: Absolute Analysis. 1959
103. Kurt Schütte: Beweistheorie. 1960
104. Kai Lai Chung: Markov chains with stationary transition probabilities. 1960
105. Willi Rinow: Die innere Geometrie der metrischen Räume. 1961
106. Heinrich Scholz, Gisbert Hasenjaeger: Grundzüge der mathematischen Logik. 1961
107. Gottfried Köthe: Topologische Lineare Räume I.
108. Eugene Dynkin: Die Grundlagen der Theorie der Markoffschen Prozesse. 1961
109. Hans Hermes: Aufzählbarkeit, Entscheidbarkeit, Berechenbarkeit: Einführung in die Theorie der rekursiven Funktionen. 1961
110. Alexander Dinghas: Vorlesungen über Funktionentheorie. 1961
111. Jacques-Louis Lions: Équations différentielles opérationnelles et problèmes aux limites. 1961
112. Dietrich Morgenstern, István Szabó: Vorlesungen über theoretische Mechanik. 1961
113. Herbert Meschkowski: Hilbertsche Räume mit Kernfunktion. 1961
114. Saunders MacLane: Homology. 1963
115. Edwin Hewitt, Kenneth A. Ross: Abstract Harmonic Analysis I: Structure of topological groups, integration theory, group representations. 1963
116. Lars Hörmander: Linear Partial Differential Operators. 1963
117. Timothy O’Meara: Introduction to Quadratic Forms. 1963
118. Friedrich Wilhelm Schäfke: Einführung in die Theorie der speziellen Funktionen der mathematischen Physik. 1963
119. Theodore E. Harris: The Theory of Branching Processes. 1963
120. Lothar Collatz: Funktionalanalysis und Numerische Mathematik. 1964
121. / 122. Eugene Dynkin: Markov Processes. 1965
123. Kōsaku Yosida: Functional Analysis. 1965
124. Dietrich Morgenstern: Einführung in die Wahrscheinlichkeitstheorie und Mathematische Statistik. 1964
125. Itō Kiyoshi, Henry McKean: Diffusion Processes and Their Sample Paths. 1965
126. Olli Lehto, Kaarlo Virtanen: Quasikonforme Abbildungen. 1965 (2. Auflage Quasiconformal mappings in the plane. 1973)
127. Hans Hermes: Enumerability, Decidability, Computability. 1965
128. Hel Braun, Max Koecher: Jordan-Algebren. 1966
129. Otton Marcin Nikodým: The Mathematical Apparatus of Quantum Theories, based on the theory of Boolean lattices. 1966
130. Charles B. Morrey: Multiple Integrals in the Calculus of Variations. 1966
131. Friedrich Hirzebruch: Topological Methods in Algebraic Geometry. 1966
132. Tosio Kato: Perturbation Theory of Linear Operators. 1966
133. Otto Haupt, Hermann Künneth: Geometrische Ordnungen. 1967
134. Bertram Huppert: Endliche Gruppen I. 1967
135. Handbook of Automatic Computation I a. Heinz Rutishauser: Description of Algol 60. (edited by Friedrich L. Bauer, Rutishauser, Alston Scott Householder, F. W. J. Olver, Klaus Samelson, Eduard Stiefel)
136. Werner H. Greub: Multilinear Algebra. 1967
137. Handbook of Automatic Computation I b. Albert A. Grau, Ursula Hill, Hans Langmaack: Translation of Algol 60. 1967
138. Wolfgang Hahn: Stability of Motion. 1967
139. Gustav Doetsch, Friedrich Wilhelm Schäfke, Horst Tietz: Mathematische Hilfsmittel des Ingenieurs I (Funktionaltransformation, Funktionentheorie, Spezielle Funktionen. Hrsg. der Reihe Robert Sauer, István Szabó), 1967
140. Lothar Collatz, Rüdiger Nicolovius, Willi Törnig: Mathematische Hilfsmittel des Ingenieurs II. (Törnig: Anfangswertprobleme bei gewöhnlichen und partiellen Differentialgleichungen, Collatz/Nicolovius: Rand- und Eigenwertprobleme bei gewöhnlichen und partiellen Differentialgleichungen und Integralgleichungen.) 1969
141. Mathematische Hilfsmittel des Ingenieurs III. (Friedrich L. Bauer, Josef Stoer: Algebra., Robert Sauer: Geometrie und Tensorkalkül., Tatomir Angelitch: Tensorkalkül nebst Anwendungen, Roland Bulirsch, Heinz Rutishauser: Interpolation und genäherte Quadratur, Georg Aumann, Approximation von Funktionen, Roland Burlisch/Josef Stoer: Darstellung von Funktionen in Rechenautomaten. Hans Paul Künzi: Lineare und nichtlineare Optimierung. Klaus Samelson: Rechenanlagen) 1968
142. Mathematische Hilfsmittel des Ingenieurs IV. (Wolfgang Hahn: Bewegungsstabilität bei Systemen mit endlich vielen Freiheitsgraden. Dietrich Morgenstern, Volker Mammitzsch: Wahrscheinlichkeitsrechnung und mathematische Statistik. Wolfgang Zander: Sätze und Formeln der Mechanik und Elektrotechnik - Mechanik, Klaus Pöschl Elektrotechnik.) 1970
143. Issai Schur: Vorlesungen über Invariantentheorie. 1968
144. André Weil: Basic Number Theory. 1967
145. Paul Leo Butzer, Hubert Berens: Semi-Groups of Operators and Approximation. 1967
146. François Treves: Locally convex spaces and linear partial differential equations. 1967
147. Klaus Lamotke: Semisimpliziale algebraische Topologie. 1968
148. K. Chandrasekharan: Introduction to analytic number theory. 1968
149. Leo Sario, Kōtarō Oikawa: Capacity Functions. 1969
150. Marius Iosifescu, Radu Theodorescu: Random Processes and Learning. 1969
151. Petr Mandl: Analytical treatment of one-dimensional Markov processes. 1968
152. Edwin Hewitt, Kenneth A. Ross: Abstract Harmonic Analysis II: Structure and analysis for compact groups, analysis on locally compact Abelian groups. 1970
153. Herbert Federer: Geometric Measure Theory. 1969
154. Ivan Singer: Bases in Banach Spaces I. 1970
155. Claus Müller: Foundations of the Mathematical Theory of Electromagnetic Waves. 1969
156. Bartel Leendert van der Waerden: Mathematical Statistics. 1969
157. Juri Wassiljewitsch Prochorow (Prokhorov), Juri Anatoljewitsch Rosanow (Yuri Anatolievich Rozanov): Probability Theory. 1969
158. Corneliu Constantinescu, Aurel Cornea: Potential Theory on Harmonic Spaces. 1972
159. Gottfried Köthe: Topological Vector Spaces I. 1969
160. Matest Mendelejewitsch Agrest, Michail Sacharowitsch Maximow: Theory of Incomplete Cylindrical Functions and Their Applications. 1971
161. Nam P. Bhatia, George P. Szegö:Giorgio Szegö|George P. Szegö: Stability Theory of Dynamical Systems. 1970
162. Rolf Nevanlinna: Analytic Functions. 1970
163. Josef Stoer, Christoph Witzgall: Convexity and Optimization in Finite Dimensions I. 1970
164. Leo Sario, Mitsuru Naka: Classification Theory of Riemann Surfaces. 1970
165. Dragoslav Mitrinović, Petar Vasić: Analytic Inequalities. 1970
166. Alexander Grothendieck, Jean Dieudonné: Élements d'Géometrie Algébrique I: Le langage des schémas. 1971
167. K. Chandrasekharan: Arithmetical Functions. 1970
168. Wiktor Pawlowitsch Palamodow (V. Palamodov): Linear Differential Operators with Constant Coefficients. 1970
169. Hans Rademacher: Topics in analytic number theory. 1973
170. Jacques-Louis Lions: Optimal Control of Systems Governed by Partial Differential Equations. 1971
171. Ivan Singer: Best Approximation in Normed Linear Spaces by Elements of Linear Subspaces. 1970
172. Hans Bühlmann: Mathematical Methods in Risk Theory. 1970
173. Fumitomo Maeda, Shuichiro Maeda: Theory of Symmetric Lattices. 1970
174. Eduard Stiefel, Gerhard Scheifele: Linear and Regular Celestial Mechanics. 1971
175. Ronald Larsen: An Introduction to the Theory of Multipliers. 1971
176. Hans Grauert, Reinhold Remmert: Analytische Stellenalgebren. 1971
177. / 178. Siegfried Flügge: Practical Quantum Mechanics I, II. 1971
179. Jean Giraud: Cohomologie non-abélienn. 1971
180. Naum Samoilowitsch Landkof: Foundations of Modern Potential Theory. 1972
181. / 182. / 183. Jacques-Louis Lions, Enrico Magenes: Non-Homogeneous Boundary-Value-Problems and Applications I, II, III. 1972, 1973
184. Murray Rosenblatt: Markov Processes. Structure and Asymptotic Behavior. 1971
185. Wojciech Rubinowicz: Sommerfeldsche Polynommethode. 1972
186. James H. Wilkinson, Christian Reinsch: Handbook of Automatic Computation II: Linear Algebra. 1971
187. Carl Ludwig Siegel, Jürgen Moser: Lectures on Celestial Mechanics. 1971
188. / 189. Garth Warner: Harmonic Analysis on Semi-Simple Lie Groups I, II. 1972
190. / 191. Carl Faith: Algebra: Rings, Modules and Categories I, II. 1973
192. Malcev: Algebraic Systems. 1973
193. George Pólya, Gábor Szegő: Problems and Theorems in Analysis I. 1972
194. Jun-Ichi Igusa: Theta Functions. 1972
195. Sterling K. Berberian: Baer *-Rings. 1972
196. Krishna B. Athreya, Peter E. Ney: Branching Processes. 1972
197. Walter Benz: Vorlesung über Geometrie der Algebren: Geometrien von Möbius, Laguerre-Lie, Minkowski in einheitlicher und grundlagengeometrischer Behandlung. 1973
198. Steven A. Gaal: Linear analysis and representation theory. 1973
199. Johannes C. C. Nitsche: Vorlesungen über Minimalflächen. 1975
200. Albrecht Dold: Lectures on Algebraic Topology. 1972
201. Anatole Beck: Continuous flows in the plane. 1974
202. Leopold Schmetterer: Introduction to mathematical statistics. 1974
203. Bruno Schoeneberg: Elliptic modular functions : an introduction. 1974
204. Vasile-Mihai Popov: Hyperstability of Control Systems. 1973
205. Sergei Michailowitsch Nikolski: Approximation of functions of several variables and imbedding theorems. 1975
206. Michel André: Homologie des algèbres commutatives. 1974
207. William F. Donoghue: Monotone matrix functions and analytic continuation. 1974
208. Howard Elton Lacey: The isometric theory of classical Banach spaces. 1974
209. Gerhard Ringel: Map Color Theorem. 1974
210. Anatoli Skorochod, Iossif Iljitsch Gichman (I. I. Gikhman): The Theory of Stochastic Processes I. 1974
211. W. Wistar Comfort, Stylianos Negrepontis: The Theory of Ultrafilters. 1974
212. Robert Massey Switzer: Algebraic topology, homotopy and homology. 1975
213. Igor Schafarewitsch: Basic Algebraic Geometry. 1974
214. Bartel Leendert van der Waerden: Group Theory and Quantum Mechanics. 1974
215. Helmut H. Schaefer: Banach lattices and positive operators. 1974
216. George Pólya, Gábor Szegő: Problems and Theorems in Analysis II. 1976
217. Bo Stenström: Rings of quotients: an introduction to methods of ring theory. 1975
218. Anatoli Skorochod, Iossif Iljitsch Gichman: The Theory of Stochastic Processes II. 1975
219. Georges Duvaut, Jacques-Louis Lions: Inequalities in mechanics and physics. 1976
220. Alexander Alexandrowitsch Kirillow: Elements of the theory of representations. 1976
221. David Mumford: Algebraic Geometry 1: Complex Projective Varieties. 1976
222. Serge Lang: Introduction to Modular Forms. 1976
223. Jöran Bergh, Jörgen Löfström: Interpolation spaces: an introduction. 1976
224. David Gilbarg, Neil S. Trudinger: Elliptic partial differential equations of second order. 1977
225. Kurt Schütte: Proof Theory. 1977
226. Max Karoubi: K-Theory. An Introduction. 1978
227. Hans Grauert, Reinhold Remmert: Theorie der Steinschen Räume. 1977
228. Irving Segal, Ray Kunze: Integrals and Operators. 1978
229. Helmut Hasse: Number Theory. 1980
230. Wilhelm Klingenberg: Lectures on closed geodesics. 1978
231. Serge Lang: Elliptic Curves, Diophantine Analysis. 1978
232. Anatoli Skorochod, Iossif Iljitsch Gichman: The Theory of Stochastic Processes III. 1979
233. Daniel W. Stroock, S. R. Srinivasa Varadhan: Multidimensional Diffusion Processes. 1979
234. Martin Aigner: Combinatorial Theory. 1979
235. Eugene Dynkin, Alexander Adolfowitsch Juschkewitsch: Controlled Markov Processes. 1979
236. Hans Grauert, Reinhold Remmert: Theory of Stein Spaces. 1979
237. Gottfried Köthe: Topological Vector Spaces II. 1979
238. Colin C. Graham, O. Carruth McGehee: Essays in commutative harmonic analysis. 1979
239. / 240. Peter D. T. A. Elliott: Probabilistic Number Theory. Teil 1 (Mean Value Theorems), 1979, Teil 2 (Central Limit Theorems), 1980
241. Walter Rudin: Function theory in the unit ball $\mathbb C^n$. 1980
242. / 243. Bertram Huppert, Norman Blackburn: Finite Groups. II, III, 1982
244. Daniel S. Kubert, Serge Lang: Modular Units. 1981
245. I. P. Cornfeld, S. V. Fomin, Ya. G. Sinai: Ergodic Theory. 1982
246. Mark Neumark, Alexander Isaakowitsch Stern: Theory of Group Representations. 1982
247. / 248 Michio Suzuki: Group Theory. Band 1,2, 1982
249. Kai Lai Chung: Lectures from Markov processes to Brownian motion. 1982
250. V. I. Arnold: Geometrical methods in the theory of ordinary differential equations. 1983
251. Shui-Nee Chow, Jack K. Hale: Methods of Bifurcation Theory. 1982
252. Thierry Aubin: Nonlinear analysis on manifolds, Monge-Ampère equations. 1982
253. Bernard Dwork: Lectures on p-adic differential equations. 1982
254. Eberhard Freitag: Siegelsche Modulfunktionen. 1983
255. Serge Lang: Complex Multiplication. 1983
256. Lars Hörmander: The analysis of linear partial differential operators. Teil 1: Distribution theory and Fourier analysis. 1983
257. Lars Hörmander: The analysis of linear partial differential operators. Teil 2: Differential operators with constant coefficients. 1983
258. Joel Smoller: Shock Waves and reaction-diffusion Equations. 1982
259. Peter Duren: Univalent Functions. 1983
260. Mark Freidlin, Alexander D. Wentzell: Random perturbations of dynamical systems. 1984
261. Siegfried Bosch, Ulrich Güntzer, Reinhold Remmert: Non-Archimedean analysis : a systematic approach to rigid analytic geometry. 1984
262. Joseph L. Doob: Classical potential theory and its probabilistic counterpart. 1984
263. Mark Krasnoselsky, Petr Petrowitsch Zabrejko: Geometrical Methods of Nonlinear Analysis. 1984
264. Jean-Pierre Aubin, Arrigo Cellina: Differential inclusions: set-valued maps and viability theory. 1984
265. Hans Grauert, Reinhold Remmert: Coherent Analytic Sheaves. 1984
266. Georges de Rham: Differentiable manifolds: forms, currents, harmonic forms. 1984
267. Enrico Arbarello, Maurizio Cornalba, Phillip Griffiths, Joe Harris: The Geometry of Algebraic Curves. Band 1, 1985
268. Enrico Arbarello, Maurizio Cornalba, Phillip Griffiths (mit Beitrag von Joe Harris): Geometry of Algebraic Curves. Band 2, 2011
269. Pierre Schapira: Microdifferential systems in the complex domain. 1985
270. Winfried Scharlau: Quadratic and Hermitian Forms. 1985
271. Richard S. Ellis: Entropy, large deviations, and statistical mechanics. 1985
272. Peter D. T. A. Elliott: Arithmetic functions and integer products. 1985
273. Nikolai Kapitonovich Nikolski: Treatise on the shift operator : spectral function theory. 1985
274. Lars Hörmander: The analysis of linear partial differential operators III: Pseudo-Differential Operators. 1985
275. Lars Hörmander: The analysis of linear partial differential operators IV: Fourier Integral Operators. 1985
276. Thomas M. Liggett: Interacting Particle Systems. 1985
277. William Fulton, Serge Lang: Riemann-Roch-Algebra. 1985
278. Michael Barr, Charles Frederick Wells: Toposes, triples and theories. 1985
279. Errett Bishop, Douglas Bridges: Constructive Analysis. 1985
280. Jürgen Neukirch: Class Field Theory. 1986
281. K. Chandrasekharan: Elliptic Functions. 1985
282. Pierre Lelong, Lawrence Gruman: Entire Functions of Several Complex Variables. 1986
283. Kunihiko Kodaira: Complex manifolds and deformation of complex structures. 1986
284. Robert Finn: Equilibrium Capillary Surfaces. 1986
285. Yu. D. Burago, V. A. Zalgaller: Geometric Inequalities. 1988
286. Anatoli N. Andrianov: Quadratic Forms and Hecke Operators. 1986
287. Bernard Maskit: Kleinian Groups. 1987
288. Jean Jacod, Albert Shiryaev: Limit theorems for stochastic processes. 1987
289. Yuri Manin: Gauge theory and complex geometry. 1988
290. John Horton Conway, Neil Sloane: Sphere packings, lattices and groups. 1988
291. Alexander J. Hahn, Timothy O’Meara: The classical groups and K-theory. 1989
292. Masaki Kashiwara, Pierre Schapira: Sheaves on manifolds. 1990
293. Daniel Revuz, Marc Yor: Continuous martingales and Brownian motion. 1991
294. Max-Albert Knus: Quadratic and hermitian forms over rings. 1991
295. / 296. Ulrich Dierkes, Stefan Hildebrandt, Albrecht Küster, Ortwin Wohlrab: Minimal Surfaces Teil 1, 2, 1992
297. Leonid Pastur, Alexander Figotin: Spectra of random and almost-periodic operators. 1992
298. Nicole Berline, Ezra Getzler, Michèle Vergne: Heat kernels and Dirac operators. 1992
299. Christian Pommerenke: Boundary behaviour of conformal maps. 1992
300. Peter Orlik, Hiroaki Terao: Arrangements of hyperplanes. 1992
301. Jean-Louis Loday: Cyclic Homology. 1992
302. Herbert Lange, Christina Birkenhake: Complex abelian varieties. 1992
303. Ronald A. DeVore, George G. Lorentz: Constructive Approximation. 1993
304. George G. Lorentz, Manfred von Golitschek, Yuly Makovoz: Constructive Approximation: Advanced Problems. 1996
305. / 306. Jean-Baptiste Hiriart-Urruty, Claude Lemaréchal: Convex analysis and minimization algorithms. Teil 1, 2, 1993
307. Albert S. Schwarz: Quantum field theory and topology. 1993
308. Albert S. Schwarz: Topology for Physicists. 1994
309. Alejandro Ádem, Richard James Milgram: Cohomology of finite groups. 1994
310. / 311. Mariano Giaquinta, Stefan Hildebrandt: Calculus of variations. 1,2, 1996
312. Kai Lai Chung, Zhongxin Zhao: From Brownian motion to Schrödinger’s equation. 1995
313. Paul Malliavin: Stochastic Analysis. 1997
314. David R. Adams, Lars Inge Hedberg: Function spaces and potential theory. 1996
315. Peter Bürgisser, Michael Clausen, M. Amin Shokrollahi: Algebraic Complexity Theory. 1997
316. Edward B. Saff, Vilmos Totik: Logarithmic potentials with external fields. 1997
317. R. Tyrrell Rockafellar, Roger J.-B. Wets: Variational Analysis. 1998
318. Shoshichi Kobayashi: Hyperbolic complex spaces. 1998
319. Martin R. Bridson, André Haefliger: Metric spaces of non-positive curvature. 1999
320. Claude Kipnis, Claudio Landim: Scaling limits of interacting particle systems. 1999
321. Geoffrey Grimmett: Percolation. 1999
322. Jürgen Neukirch: Algebraic Number Theory. 1999
323. Jürgen Neukirch, Alexander Schmidt, Kay Wingberg: Cohomology of Number Fields. 2000
324. Thomas M. Liggett: Stochastic interacting systems: contact, voter and exclusion processes. 1999
325. Constantine M. Dafermos: Hyperbolic conservation laws in continuum physics. 2000
326. Michel Waldschmidt: Diophantine approximation on linear algebraic groups: transcendence properties of the exponential function in several variables. 2000
327. Jacques Martinet: Perfect lattices in Euclidean spaces. 2003
328. Marius van der Put, Michael F. Singer: Galois theory of linear differential equations. 2003
329. Jacob Korevaar: Tauberian Theory: A Century of Developments. 2004
330. / 331. Boris Mordukhovich: Variational analysis and generalized differentiation. Band 1 und 2, 2006
332. Masaki Kashiwara, Pierre Schapira: Categories and sheaves. 2006
333. Geoffrey Grimmett: The random-cluster model. 2006
334. Edoardo Sernesi: Deformations of algebraic schemes. 2006
335. Colin Bushnell, Guy Henniart: The local Langlands' conjecture for GL(2). 2006
336. Peter M. Gruber: Convex and discrete geometry. 2007
337. Wladimir Gilelewitsch Masja, Tatjana Olegowna Schaposchnikowa: Theory of Sobolev Multipliers with application to differential and integral operators. 2009
338. Cedric Villani: Optimal transport: old and new. 2009
339. Ulrich Dierkes, Stefan Hildebrandt, Friedrich Sauvigny: Minimal Surfaces. Teil 1, 2010 (Neue Bearbeitung der Nr. 295/296 in drei Bänden)
340. Ulrich Dierkes, Stefan Hildebrandt, Anthony J. Tromba: Minimal Surfaces. Teil 2 Regularity of minimal surfaces. 2010
341. Ulrich Dierkes, Stefan Hildebrandt, Anthony J. Tromba: Minimal Surfaces. Teil 3: Global analysis of minimal surfaces. 2010
342. Wladimir Gilelewitsch Masja: Sobolev spaces : with applications to elliptic partial differential equations. 2011
343. Hajer Bahouri, Jean-Yves Chemin, Raphaël Danchin: Fourier analysis and nonlinear partial differential equations. 2011
344. Peter Schneider: p-Adic Lie groups. 2011
345. Tomasz Komorowski, Claudio Landim, Stefano Olla: Fluctuations in Markov processes: time symmetry and martingale approximation. 2012
346. Jean-Louis Loday, Bruno Vallette: Algebraic Operads. 2012
347. Camille Laurent-Gengoux, Anne Pichereau, Pol Vanhaecke: Poisson Structures. 2013
348. Dominique Bakry, Ivan Gentil, Michel Ledoux: Analysis and Geometry of Markov Diffusion Operators. 2014
349. Peter Bürgisser, Felipe Cucker: Condition : the geometry of numerical algorithms. 2013
350. Junjirō Noguchi, Jörg Winkelmann: Nevanlinna theory in several complex variables and diophantine approximation. 2014
351. Anton Bovier, Frank den Hollander: Metastability. A Potential-Theoretic Approach. 2015
352. Scott Armstrong, Tuomo Kuusi, Jean-Christophe Mourrat: Quantitative Stochastic Homogenization and Large-Scale Regularity. 2019
353. Nicolas Lerner: Carleman Inequalities: An Introduction and More. 2019
354. Barry Simon: Loewner's Theorem on Monotone Matrix Functions. 2019
355. Edwin Beggs, Shahn Majid: Quantum Riemannian Geometry. 2020
356. Daniel Barlet, Jon Ingolfur Magnússon: Complex analytic cycles, I. 2020
357. David Mond, Juan J. Nuño-Ballesteros: Singularities of Mappings: The Local Behaviour of Smooth and Complex Analytic Mappings. 2020
358. Matthias Keller, Daniel Lenz, Radosław K. Wojciechowski: Graphs and Discrete Dirichlet Spaces. 2021
359. François Treves: Analytic Partial Differential Equations. 2022
360. László Fejes Tóth, Gábor Fejes Tóth, Włodzimierz Kuperberg: Lagerungen – Arrangements in the Plane, on the Sphere, and in Space. 2023
361. Santiago López de Medrano: Topology and Geometry of Intersections of Ellipsoids in $\R^n$. 2023.
362. Wolfgang Lück, Tibor Macko: Surgery Theory. 2024
363. Daniel Barlet, Jón Magnússon: Complex Analytic Cycles II. 2025
364. Bertram Huppert, Finite Groups I. 2025
365. Cristian Giardinà, Frank Redig: Duality for Markov Processes. 2025

== See also ==
- de:Grundlehren der mathematischen Wissenschaften
