= Heinz Bauer =

German mathematician (1925–2002)

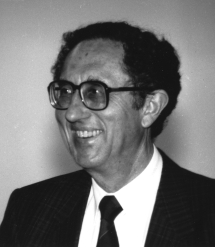
- Born: 31 January 1928; Nuremberg, Germany
- Died: 15 August 2002 (aged 74); Erlangen, Germany
- Education: University of Erlangen-Nuremberg
- Awards: Bavarian Order of Merit; Fellow of the Leopoldina; Chauvenet Prize (1980)
- Scientific career
- Fields: Mathematics
- Workplaces: University of Erlangen-Nuremberg
- Academic advisors: Otto Haupt
- Doctoral students: Karl-Theodor Sturm

Heinz Bauer (31 January 1928 – 15 August 2002) was a German mathematician.

Bauer studied at the University of Erlangen-Nuremberg and received his PhD there in 1953 under the supervision of Otto Haupt and finished his habilitation in 1956, both for work with Otto Haupt. After a short time from 1961 to 1965 as professor at the University of Hamburg he stayed his whole career at the University of Erlangen-Nuremberg. His research focuses were potential theory, probability theory, and functional analysis.

Bauer received the Chauvenet Prize in 1980 and became a member of the German Academy of Sciences Leopoldina in 1986. Bauer died in Erlangen.
