= Hilb =

Hilb may refer to:

- Emil Hilb (1882–1929), German-Jewish mathematician
- Hilbert scheme, in algebraic geometry

== See also ==
- Hilb, Rogal & Hobbs Co.
