= Robert Sauer =

Robert Sauer may refer to:

- Robert Sauer (mathematician), German mathematician
- Robert T. Sauer, American biochemist
