= Hans Jörg Stetter =

German mathematician (1930–2025)

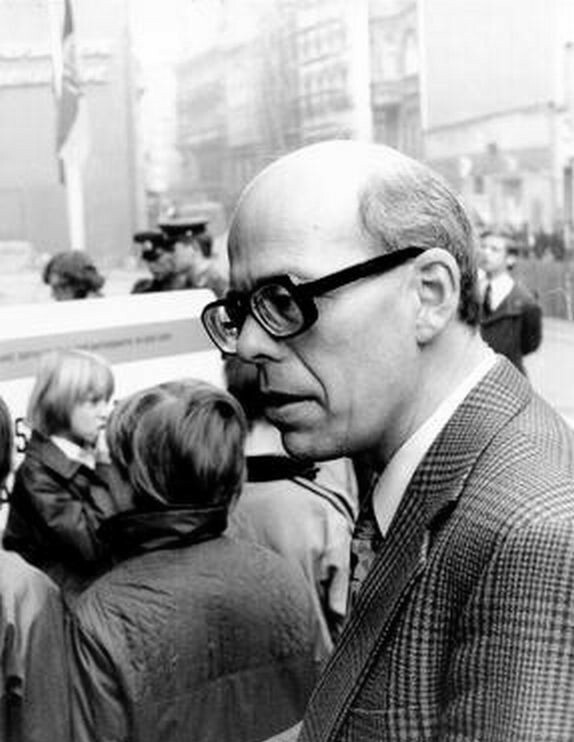
- Stetter in 1974
- Born: 8 April 1930; Munich, Bavaria, Germany
- Died: 27 October 2025 (aged 95)
- Scientific career
- Workplaces: Technical University of Vienna
- Thesis: Beiträge zum Wechselwirkungsproblem in linearisierter Überschallströmung
- Doctoral advisor: Robert Max Friedrich Sauer

Hans Jörg Stetter (8 April 1930 – 27 October 2025) was a German mathematician, specialising in numerical analysis. He taught at the Technical University of Vienna starting from 1965. He established the Institute of Analysis and Scientific Computing and the university's first computing centre. He published a pioneering book, Numerical Polynomial Algebra, in 2004.

== Life and career ==
Stetter was born in Munich on 8 April 1930. He studied at the Ludwig-Maximilians-Universität München and then at the Technical University of Munich. For one academic year, he was an undergraduate exchange student in Fort Collins at the Colorado State College of Agriculture and Mechanic Arts, i.e. Colorado A&M (renamed, in 1957, Colorado State University), where he participated in the Putnam competition and was awarded an honorable mention. After receiving a master's degree as a qualification for teaching in secondary school, he studied the numerical analysis of partial differential equations (PDEs) with applications to fluid dynamics and received his promotion from the Technical University of Munich under Robert Max Friedrich Sauer with the 1956 doctoral dissertation Beiträge zum Wechselwirkungsproblem in linearisierter Überschallströmung (Contributions to the interaction problem in linearized supersonic flow), devoted to hyperbolic partial differential equations in gas dynamics. Stetter became in 1965 a professor ordinarius at the Technical University of Vienna, where he established the university’s first computing centre, and the field of computer science as an independent discipline at the university, including advocating for it on a federal level, leading to a change in national law regarding technical studies in 1969.

In the 1960s, he turned to the numerical analysis of ordinary differential equations (ODEs) and specialized in error analysis and asymptotic developments, among other ODE topics. Based upon ideas published by the physicist Lewis Fry Richardson and by the astronomer Pedro E. Zadunaisky, Stetter developed in the 1970s an iterative method, now called the defect correction method, for error estimation in ODEs. He also dealt with polynomial algebra at the interface between numerical analysis and computer algebra. His book Numerical Polynomial Algebra (2004) was the first in the field.

In 1974, Stetter was an Invited Speaker at the ICM in Vancouver. In 1984 he was elected a member of the Academy of Sciences Leopoldina.

Stetter taught generations of students, in a style described as clear in methodology, uniting "ideas, formal rigor, and intuition". After retirement, he remained connected to the Institute of Analysis and Scientific Computing as a regular guest at events.

Stetter died on 27 October 2025, at the age of 95.

== Selected publications ==
=== Articles ===
- with Friedrich L. Bauer: "Zur numerischen Fourier-Transformation", Numerische Mathematik, vol. 1, 1959, 208–220. doi:10.1007/BF01386386.
- "Asymptotic expansions for the error in discretization algorithms for non-linear functional equations", Numerische Mathematik, vol. 7, 1965. doi:10.1007/BF01397970.
- "Stabilizing predictors for weakly unstable correctors", Mathematics of Computation, vol. 19, 1965, 84–89. doi:10.1090/S0025-5718-1965-0178576-9.
- "The defect correction principle and discretization methods", Numerische Mathematik, vol. 29, 1978, 425–433. doi:10.1007/BF01432879.

=== Books ===
- Analysis of Discretization Methods in Ordinary Differential Equations, Springer, 1973; Stetter, Hans J. (2013). Analysis of Discretization Methods in Ordinary Differential Equations (Softcover reprint ed.). Springer. ISBN 978-3-642-65471-8.
- as editor with Klaus Böhmer: Defect correction methods, Springer, 1984; Böhmer, K.; Stetter, H. J. (2012). Defect Correction Methods (Softcover reprint ed.). Springer. ISBN 978-3-7091-7023-6.
- Numerical Polynomial Algebra, SIAM, 2004, doi:10.1137/1.9780898717976.
