= Interpolation space =

Vector space in mathematics

In the field of mathematical analysis, an interpolation space is a space which lies "in between" two other Banach spaces. The main applications are in Sobolev spaces, where spaces of functions that have a noninteger number of derivatives are interpolated from the spaces of functions with integer number of derivatives.

== History ==
The theory of interpolation of vector spaces began by an observation of Józef Marcinkiewicz, later generalized and now known as the Riesz-Thorin theorem. In simple terms, if a linear function is continuous on a certain space L^{p} and also on a certain space L^{q}, then it is also continuous on the space L^{r}, for any intermediate r between p and q. In other words, L^{r} is a space which is intermediate between L^{p} and L^{q}.

In the development of Sobolev spaces, it became clear that the trace spaces were not any of the usual function spaces (with integer number of derivatives), and Jacques-Louis Lions discovered that indeed these trace spaces were constituted of functions that have a noninteger degree of differentiability.

Many methods were designed to generate such spaces of functions, including the Fourier transform, complex interpolation, real interpolation, as well as other tools (see e.g. fractional derivative).

== The setting of interpolation ==
A Banach space X is said to be continuously embedded in a Hausdorff topological vector space Z when X is a linear subspace of Z such that the inclusion map from X into Z is continuous. A compatible couple (X_{0}, X_{1}) of Banach spaces consists of two Banach spaces X_{0} and X_{1} that are continuously embedded in the same Hausdorff topological vector space Z. The embedding in a linear space Z allows to consider the two linear subspaces

$$X_0 \cap X_1$$

and

$$X_0 + X_1 = \left \{ z \in Z : z = x_0 + x_1, \ x_0 \in X_0, \, x_1 \in X_1 \right \}.$$

Interpolation does not depend only upon the isomorphic (nor isometric) equivalence classes of X_{0} and X_{1}. It depends in an essential way from the specific relative position that X_{0} and X_{1} occupy in a larger space Z.

One can define norms on X_{0} ∩ X_{1} and X_{0} + X_{1} by

$$\|x\|_{X_0 \cap X_1} := \max \left ( \left \|x \right \|_{X_0}, \left \|x \right \|_{X_1} \right ),$$
$$\|x\|_{X_0 + X_1} := \inf \left \{ \left \|x_0 \right \|_{X_0} + \left \|x_1 \right \|_{X_1} \ : \  x = x_0 + x_1, \; x_0 \in X_0, \; x_1 \in X_1 \right \}.$$

Equipped with these norms, the intersection and the sum are Banach spaces. The following inclusions are all continuous:

$$X_0 \cap X_1 \subset X_0,  \ X_1 \subset X_0 + X_1.$$

Interpolation studies the family of spaces X that are intermediate spaces between X_{0} and X_{1} in the sense that

$$X_0 \cap X_1 \subset X \subset X_0 + X_1,$$

where the two inclusions maps are continuous.

An example of this situation is the pair (L^{1}(R), L^{∞}(R)), where the two Banach spaces are continuously embedded in the space Z of measurable functions on the real line, equipped with the topology of convergence in measure. In this situation, the spaces L^{p}(R), for 1 ≤ p ≤ ∞ are intermediate between L^{1}(R) and L^{∞}(R). More generally,

$$L^{p_0}(\mathbf{R}) \cap L^{p_1}(\mathbf{R}) \subset L^p(\mathbf{R}) \subset L^{p_0}(\mathbf{R}) + L^{p_1}(\mathbf{R}), \ \ \text{when} \ \  1 \le p_0 \le p \le p_1 \le \infty,$$

with continuous injections, so that, under the given condition, L^{p}(R) is intermediate between L^{p_{0}}(R) and L^{p_{1}}(R).

Definition. Given two compatible couples (X_{0}, X_{1}) and (Y_{0}, Y_{1}), an interpolation pair is a couple (X, Y) of Banach spaces with the two following properties:
- The space X is intermediate between X_{0} and X_{1}, and Y is intermediate between Y_{0} and Y_{1}.
- If L is any linear operator from X_{0} + X_{1} to Y_{0} + Y_{1}, which maps continuously X_{0} to Y_{0} and X_{1} to Y_{1}, then it also maps continuously X to Y.

The interpolation pair (X, Y) is said to be of exponent θ (with 0 < θ < 1) if there exists a constant C such that

$$\|L\|_{X,Y} \leq C \|L\|_{X_0,Y_0}^{1-\theta} \; \|L\|_{X_1,Y_1}^{\theta}$$

for all operators L as above. The notation ||L||_{X,Y} is for the norm of L as a map from X to Y. If C = 1, we say that (X, Y) is an exact interpolation pair of exponent θ.

== Complex interpolation ==
If the scalars are complex numbers, properties of complex analytic functions are used to define an interpolation space. Given a compatible couple (X_{0}, X_{1}) of Banach spaces, the linear space $\mathcal{F}(X_0, X_1)$ consists of all functions f : C → X_{0} + X_{1}, that are analytic on S = {z : 0 < Re(z) < 1}, continuous on S̅ = {z : 0 ≤ Re(z) ≤ 1}, and for which all the following subsets are bounded:

{ f (z) : z ∈ S} ⊂ X_{0} + X_{1},
{ f (it) : t ∈ R} ⊂ X_{0},
{ f (1 + it) : t ∈ R} ⊂ X_{1}.

$\mathcal{F}(X_0, X_1)$ is a Banach space under the norm

$$\|f\|_{\mathcal{F}(X_0, X_1)} = \max \left\{ \sup_{t \in \mathbf{R}} \|f(it)\|_{X_0}, \; \sup_{t \in \mathbf{R}}\|f(1 + it)\|_{X_1} \right\}.$$

Definition. For 0 < θ < 1, the complex interpolation space (X_{0}, X_{1})_{θ} is the linear subspace of X_{0} + X_{1} consisting of all values f(θ) when f varies in the preceding space of functions,

$$(X_0, X_1)_\theta = \left \{ x \in X_0 + X_1 : x = f(\theta), \; f \in \mathcal{F}(X_0, X_1) \right \}.$$

The norm on the complex interpolation space (X_{0}, X_{1})_{θ} is defined by

$$\ \|x\|_\theta = \inf \left \{ \|f\|_{\mathcal{F}(X_0, X_1)} \ :\ f(\theta) = x, \; f \in \mathcal{F}(X_0, X_1) \right \}.$$

Equipped with this norm, the complex interpolation space (X_{0}, X_{1})_{θ} is a Banach space.

Theorem. Given two compatible couples of Banach spaces (X_{0}, X_{1}) and (Y_{0}, Y_{1}), the pair ((X_{0}, X_{1})_{θ}, (Y_{0}, Y_{1})_{θ}) is an exact interpolation pair of exponent θ, i.e., if T : X_{0} + X_{1} → Y_{0} + Y_{1}, is a linear operator bounded from X_{j} to Y_{j}, j = 0, 1, then T is bounded from (X_{0}, X_{1})_{θ} to (Y_{0}, Y_{1})_{θ} and
$$\|T\|_\theta \le \|T\|_0^{1 - \theta} \|T\|_1^\theta.$$

The family of L^{p} spaces (consisting of complex valued functions) behaves well under complex interpolation. If (R, Σ, μ) is an arbitrary measure space, if 1 ≤ p_{0}, p_{1} ≤ ∞ and 0 < θ < 1, then

$$\left( L^{p_0}(R, \Sigma, \mu), L^{p_1}(R, \Sigma, \mu) \right)_\theta = L^p(R, \Sigma, \mu), \qquad \frac{1}{p} = \frac{1 - \theta}{p_0} + \frac{\theta}{p_1},$$

with equality of norms. This fact is closely related to the Riesz–Thorin theorem.

== Real interpolation ==
There are two ways for introducing the real interpolation method. The first and most commonly used when actually identifying examples of interpolation spaces is the K-method. The second method, the J-method, gives the same interpolation spaces as the K-method when the parameter θ is in (0, 1). That the J- and K-methods agree is important for the study of duals of interpolation spaces: basically, the dual of an interpolation space constructed by the K-method appears to be a space constructed from the dual couple by the J-method; see below.

=== K-method ===
The K-method of real interpolation can be used for Banach spaces over the field R of real numbers.

Definition. Let (X_{0}, X_{1}) be a compatible couple of Banach spaces. For t > 0 and every x ∈ X_{0} + X_{1}, let

$$K(x, t; X_0, X_1) = \inf \left \{ \left \|x_0 \right \|_{X_0} + t \left \|x_1 \right \|_{X_1} \ :\  x = x_0 + x_1, \; x_0 \in X_0, \, x_1 \in X_1 \right \}.$$

Changing the order of the two spaces results in:

$$K(x, t; X_0, X_1) = t K \left (x, t^{-1}; X_1, X_0 \right).$$

Let

$$\begin{align}
\|x\|_{\theta,q; K} &= \left( \int_0^\infty \left( t^{-\theta} K(x, t; X_0, X_1) \right)^q \, \tfrac{dt}{t} \right)^{\frac{1}{q}}, && 0 < \theta < 1, 1 \leq q < \infty, \\
\|x\|_{\theta,\infty; K} &= \sup_{t > 0} \; t^{-\theta} K(x, t; X_0, X_1), &&  0 \le \theta \le 1.
\end{align}$$

The K-method of real interpolation consists in taking K_{θ,q}(X_{0}, X_{1}) to be the linear subspace of X_{0} + X_{1} consisting of all x such that ||x||_{θ,q;K} < ∞.

==== Example ====
An important example is that of the couple (L^{1}(R, Σ, μ), L^{∞}(R, Σ, μ)), where the functional K(t, f ; L^{1}, L^{∞}) can be computed explicitly. The measure μ is supposed σ-finite. In this context, the best way of cutting the function f ∈ L^{1} + L^{∞} as sum of two functions f_{0} ∈ L^{1} and f_{1} ∈ L^{∞} is, for some s > 0 to be chosen as function of t, to let f_{1}(x) be given for all x ∈ R by

$$f_1(x) = \begin{cases}
f(x) & |f(x)| < s, \\
\frac{s f(x)}{|f(x)|} & \text{otherwise}
\end{cases}$$

The optimal choice of s leads to the formula

$$K \left (f, t; L^1, L^\infty \right ) = \int_0^t f^*(u) \, d u,$$

where f^{∗} is the decreasing rearrangement of f .

=== J-method ===
As with the K-method, the J-method can be used for real Banach spaces.

Definition. Let (X_{0}, X_{1}) be a compatible couple of Banach spaces. For t > 0 and for every vector x ∈ X_{0} ∩ X_{1}, let
$$J(x, t; X_0, X_1) = \max \left ( \|x\|_{X_0}, t \|x\|_{X_1} \right ).$$

A vector x in X_{0} + X_{1} belongs to the interpolation space J_{θ,q}(X_{0}, X_{1}) if and only if it can be written as

$$x = \int_0^\infty v(t) \, \frac{dt}{t},$$

where v(t) is measurable with values in X_{0} ∩ X_{1} and such that

$$\Phi(v) = \left( \int_0^\infty \left( t^{-\theta} J(v(t), t; X_0, X_1) \right)^q \, \tfrac{dt}{t} \right)^{\frac{1}{q}} < \infty.$$

The norm of x in J_{θ,q}(X_{0}, X_{1}) is given by the formula

$$\|x\|_{\theta,q;J} := \inf_v \left\{ \Phi(v) \ :\ x = \int_0^\infty v(t) \, \tfrac{dt}{t} \right\}.$$

=== Relations between the interpolation methods ===
The two real interpolation methods are equivalent when 0 < θ < 1.

Theorem. Let (X_{0}, X_{1}) be a compatible couple of Banach spaces. If 0 < θ < 1 and 1 ≤ q ≤ ∞, then
$$J_{\theta,q}(X_0, X_1) = K_{\theta,q}(X_0, X_1),$$
with equivalence of norms.

The theorem covers degenerate cases that have not been excluded: for example if X_{0} and X_{1} form a direct sum, then the intersection and the J-spaces are the null space, and a simple computation shows that the K-spaces are also null.

When 0 < θ < 1, one can speak, up to an equivalent renorming, about the Banach space obtained by the real interpolation method with parameters θ and q. The notation for this real interpolation space is (X_{0}, X_{1})_{θ,q}. One has that

$$(X_0, X_1)_{\theta, q} = (X_1, X_0)_{1 - \theta, q}, \qquad 0 < \theta < 1, 1 \le q \le \infty.$$

For a given value of θ, the real interpolation spaces increase with q: if 0 < θ < 1 and 1 ≤ q ≤ r ≤ ∞, the following continuous inclusion holds true:

$$(X_0, X_1)_{\theta, q} \subset (X_0, X_1)_{\theta, r}.$$

Theorem. Given 0 < θ < 1, 1 ≤ q ≤ ∞ and two compatible couples (X_{0}, X_{1}) and (Y_{0}, Y_{1}), the pair ((X_{0}, X_{1})_{θ,q}, (Y_{0}, Y_{1})_{θ,q}) is an exact interpolation pair of exponent θ.

A complex interpolation space is usually not isomorphic to one of the spaces given by the real interpolation method. However, there is a general relationship.

Theorem. Let (X_{0}, X_{1}) be a compatible couple of Banach spaces. If 0 < θ < 1, then
$$(X_0, X_1)_{\theta, 1} \subset (X_0, X_1)_\theta \subset (X_0, X_1)_{\theta, \infty}.$$

==== Examples ====
When X_{0} = C([0, 1]) and X_{1} = C^{1}([0, 1]), the space of continuously differentiable functions on [0, 1], the (θ, ∞) interpolation method, for 0 < θ < 1, gives the Hölder space C^{0,θ} of exponent θ. This is because the K-functional K(f, t; X_{0}, X_{1}) of this couple is equivalent to

$$\sup \left\{ |f(u)|, \, \frac{|f(u) - f(v)|}{1 + t^{-1} |u - v|} \ : \ u, v \in [0, 1] \right\}.$$

Only values 0 < t < 1 are interesting here.

Real interpolation between L^{p} spaces gives the family of Lorentz spaces. Assuming 0 < θ < 1 and 1 ≤ q ≤ ∞, one has:

$$\left ( L^1(\mathbf{R}, \Sigma, \mu), L^\infty(\mathbf{R}, \Sigma, \mu) \right)_{\theta, q} = L^{p, q}(\mathbf{R}, \Sigma, \mu), \qquad \text{where } \tfrac{1}{p} = 1 - \theta,$$

with equivalent norms. This follows from an inequality of Hardy and from the value given above of the K-functional for this compatible couple. When q = p, the Lorentz space L^{p,p} is equal to L^{p}, up to renorming. When q = ∞, the Lorentz space L^{p,∞} is equal to weak-L^{p}.

== The reiteration theorem ==
An intermediate space X of the compatible couple (X_{0}, X_{1}) is said to be of class θ if

$$(X_0, X_1)_{\theta,1} \subset X \subset (X_0, X_1)_{\theta,\infty},$$

with continuous injections. Beside all real interpolation spaces (X_{0}, X_{1})_{θ,q} with parameter θ and 1 ≤ q ≤ ∞, the complex interpolation space (X_{0}, X_{1})_{θ} is an intermediate space of class θ of the compatible couple (X_{0}, X_{1}).

The reiteration theorems says, in essence, that interpolating with a parameter θ behaves, in some way, like forming a convex combination a = (1 − θ)x_{0} + θx_{1}: taking a further convex combination of two convex combinations gives another convex combination.

Theorem. Let A_{0}, A_{1} be intermediate spaces of the compatible couple (X_{0}, X_{1}), of class θ_{0} and θ_{1} respectively, with 0 < θ_{0} ≠ θ_{1} < 1. When 0 < θ < 1 and 1 ≤ q ≤ ∞, one has
$$(A_0, A_1)_{\theta, q} = (X_0, X_1)_{\eta, q}, \qquad \eta = (1 - \theta) \theta_0 + \theta \theta_1.$$

It is notable that when interpolating with the real method between A_{0} = (X_{0}, X_{1})_{θ_{0},q_{0}} and A_{1} = (X_{0}, X_{1})_{θ_{1},q_{1}}, only the values of θ_{0} and θ_{1} matter. Also, A_{0} and A_{1} can be complex interpolation spaces between X_{0} and X_{1}, with parameters θ_{0} and θ_{1} respectively.

There is also a reiteration theorem for the complex method.

Theorem. Let (X_{0}, X_{1}) be a compatible couple of complex Banach spaces, and assume that X_{0} ∩ X_{1} is dense in X_{0} and in X_{1}. Let A_{0} = (X_{0}, X_{1})_{θ_{0}} and A_{1} = (X_{0}, X_{1})_{θ_{1}}, where 0 ≤ θ_{0} ≤ θ_{1} ≤ 1. Assume further that X_{0} ∩ X_{1} is dense in A_{0} ∩ A_{1}. Then, for every 0 ≤ θ ≤ 1,
$$\left( \left (X_0, X_1 \right )_{\theta_0}, \left (X_0, X_1 \right )_{\theta_1} \right)_\theta = (X_0, X_1)_\eta, \qquad \eta = (1 - \theta) \theta_0 + \theta \theta_1.$$

The density condition is always satisfied when X_{0} ⊂ X_{1} or X_{1} ⊂ X_{0}.

== Duality ==
Let (X_{0}, X_{1}) be a compatible couple, and assume that X_{0} ∩ X_{1} is dense in X_{0} and in X_{1}. In this case, the restriction map from the (continuous) dual $X'_j$ of X_{j}, j = 0, 1, to the dual of X_{0} ∩ X_{1} is one-to-one. It follows that the pair of duals $\left (X'_0, X'_1 \right )$ is a compatible couple continuously embedded in the dual (X_{0} ∩ X_{1})′.

For the complex interpolation method, the following duality result holds:

Theorem. Let (X_{0}, X_{1}) be a compatible couple of complex Banach spaces, and assume that X_{0} ∩ X_{1} is dense in X_{0} and in X_{1}. If X_{0} and X_{1} are reflexive, then the dual of the complex interpolation space is obtained by interpolating the duals,
$$( (X_0, X_1)_\theta )' = \left(X'_0, X'_1 \right )_\theta, \qquad 0 < \theta < 1.$$

In general, the dual of the space (X_{0}, X_{1})_{θ} is equal to $\left (X'_0, X'_1 \right )^{\theta},$ a space defined by a variant of the complex method. The upper-θ and lower-θ methods do not coincide in general, but they do if at least one of X_{0}, X_{1} is a reflexive space.

For the real interpolation method, the duality holds provided that the parameter q is finite:

Theorem. Let 0 < θ < 1, 1 ≤ q < ∞ and (X_{0}, X_{1}) a compatible couple of real Banach spaces. Assume that X_{0} ∩ X_{1} is dense in X_{0} and in X_{1}. Then
$$\left ( \left (X_0, X_1 \right )_{\theta, q} \right )' = \left (X'_0, X'_1 \right )_{\theta, q'},$$
where $\tfrac{1}{q'} = 1 - \tfrac{1}{q}.$

== Discrete definitions ==
Since the function t → K(x, t) varies regularly (it is increasing, but 1/tK(x, t) is decreasing), the definition of the K_{θ,q}-norm of a vector n, previously given by an integral, is equivalent to a definition given by a series. This series is obtained by breaking (0, ∞) into pieces (2^{n}, 2^{n+1}) of equal mass for the measure dt/t,

$$\|x\|_{\theta, q; K} \simeq \left( \sum_{n \in \mathbf{Z}} \left( 2^{-\theta n} K \left (x, 2^n; X_0, X_1 \right ) \right)^q \right)^{\frac{1}{q}}.$$

In the special case where X_{0} is continuously embedded in X_{1}, one can omit the part of the series with negative indices n. In this case, each of the functions x → K(x, 2^{n}; X_{0}, X_{1}) defines an equivalent norm on X_{1}.

The interpolation space (X_{0}, X_{1})_{θ,q} is a "diagonal subspace" of an ℓ^{q}-sum of a sequence of Banach spaces (each one being isomorphic to X_{0} + X_{1}). Therefore, when q is finite, the dual of (X_{0}, X_{1})_{θ,q} is a quotient of the ℓ^{p}-sum of the duals, 1/p + 1/q = 1, which leads to the following formula for the discrete J_{θ,p}-norm of a functional x' in the dual of (X_{0}, X_{1})_{θ,q}:

$$\|x'\|_{\theta, p; J} \simeq \inf \left\{ \left( \sum_{n \in \mathbf{Z}} \left( 2^{\theta n} \max \left (\left \|x'_n \right \|_{X'_0}, 2^{-n} \left \|x'_n \right\|_{X'_1} \right ) \right)^p \right)^{\frac{1}{p}} \ : \ x' = \sum_{n \in \mathbf{Z}} x'_n \right\}.$$

The usual formula for the discrete J_{θ,p}-norm is obtained by changing n to −n.

The discrete definition makes several questions easier to study, among which the already mentioned identification of the dual. Other such questions are compactness or weak-compactness of linear operators. Lions and Peetre have proved that:

Theorem. If the linear operator T is compact from X_{0} to a Banach space Y and bounded from X_{1} to Y, then T is compact from (X_{0}, X_{1})_{θ,q} to Y when 0 < θ < 1, 1 ≤ q ≤ ∞.

Davis, Figiel, Johnson and Pełczyński have used interpolation in their proof of the following result:

Theorem. A bounded linear operator between two Banach spaces is weakly compact if and only if it factors through a reflexive space.

=== A general interpolation method ===
The space ℓ^{q} used for the discrete definition can be replaced by an arbitrary sequence space Y with unconditional basis, and the weights a_{n} = 2^{−θn}, b_{n} = 2^{(1−θ)n}, that are used for the K_{θ,q}-norm, can be replaced by general weights

$$a_n, b_n > 0, \ \ \sum_{n=1}^\infty \min(a_n, b_n) < \infty.$$

The interpolation space K(X_{0}, X_{1}, Y, {a_{n}}, {b_{n}}) consists of the vectors x in X_{0} + X_{1} such that

$$\|x\|_{K(X_0, X_1)} = \sup_{m \ge 1} \left \| \sum_{n=1}^m a_n K \left (x, \tfrac{b_n}{a_n}; X_0, X_1 \right) \, y_n \right\|_Y < \infty,$$

where {y_{n}} is the unconditional basis of Y. This abstract method can be used, for example, for the proof of the following result:

Theorem. A Banach space with unconditional basis is isomorphic to a complemented subspace of a space with symmetric basis.

== Interpolation of Sobolev and Besov spaces ==
Several interpolation results are available for Sobolev spaces and Besov spaces on R^{n},

$$\begin{align}
&H^s_p && s \in \mathbf{R}, 1 \le p \le \infty \\
&B^s_{p, q} && s \in \mathbf{R}, 1 \le p, q \le \infty
\end{align}$$

These spaces are spaces of measurable functions on R^{n} when s ≥ 0, and of tempered distributions on R^{n} when s < 0. For the rest of the section, the following setting and notation will be used:

$$\begin{align}
0 &< \theta < 1, \\
1 &\le p, p_0, p_1, q, q_0, q_1 \le \infty, \\
s, &s_0, s_1 \in \mathbf{R}, \\
s_\theta &= (1 - \theta) s_0 + \theta s_1, \\[4pt]
\frac 1 {p_\theta} &= \frac{1 - \theta}{p_0} + \frac{\theta}{p_1}, \\[4pt]
\frac 1 {q_\theta} &= \frac{1 - \theta}{q_0} + \frac{\theta}{q_1}.
\end{align}$$

Complex interpolation works well on the class of Sobolev spaces $H^{s}_{p}$ (the Bessel potential spaces) as well as Besov spaces:

$$\begin{align}
\left (H^{s_0}_{p_0}, H^{s_1}_{p_1} \right )_\theta &= H^{s_\theta}_{p_\theta}, && s_0 \ne s_1, 1 < p_0, p_1 < \infty. \\
\left (B^{s_0}_{p_0,q_0}, B^{s_1}_{p_1,q_1} \right)_\theta &= B^{s_\theta}_{p_\theta, q_\theta}, && s_0 \ne s_1.
\end{align}$$

Real interpolation between Sobolev spaces may give Besov spaces, except when s_{0} = s_{1},

$$\left (H^{s}_{p_0}, H^{s}_{p_1} \right)_{\theta, p_\theta} = H^{s}_{p_\theta}.$$

When s_{0} ≠ s_{1} but p_{0} = p_{1}, real interpolation between Sobolev spaces gives a Besov space:

$$\left (H^{s_0}_p, H^{s_1}_p \right)_{\theta, q} = B^{s_\theta}_{p, q}, \qquad s_0 \ne s_1.$$

Also,

$$\begin{align}
\left (B^{s_0}_{p,q_0}, B^{s_1}_{p,q_1} \right)_{\theta, q} &= B^{s_\theta}_{p,q}, && s_0 \ne s_1. \\
\left (B^s_{p,q_0}, B^s_{p, q_1} \right )_{\theta, q} &= B^{s}_{p, q_\theta}. \\
\left (B^{s_0}_{p_0,q_0}, B^{s_1}_{p_1,q_1} \right )_{\theta, q_\theta} &= B^{s_\theta}_{p_\theta, q_\theta}, && s_0 \ne s_1, p_\theta =q_\theta.
\end{align}$$

== See also ==
- Fundamental lemma of interpolation theory
- Riesz–Thorin theorem
- Marcinkiewicz interpolation theorem
