= Cohen–Hewitt factorization theorem =

Theorem of mathematics

In mathematics, the Cohen–Hewitt factorization theorem states that if $V$ is a left module over a Banach algebra $B$ with a left approximate unit $(u_{i})_{i \in I}$, then an element $v$ of $V$ can be factorized as a product $v = b w$ (for some $b \in B$ and $w \in V$) whenever $\displaystyle \lim_{i \in I} u_{i} v = v$. The theorem was introduced by Paul Cohen (1959) and Edwin Hewitt (1964).
