= Lorentz space =

Function space

In mathematical analysis, Lorentz spaces, introduced by George G. Lorentz in the 1950s, are generalisations of the more familiar $L^{p}$ spaces.

The Lorentz spaces are denoted by $L^{p,q}$. Like the $L^{p}$ spaces, they are characterized by a norm (technically a quasinorm) that encodes information about the "size" of a function, just as the $L^{p}$ norm does. The two basic qualitative notions of "size" of a function are: how tall is the graph of the function, and how spread out is it. The Lorentz norms provide tighter control over both qualities than the $L^{p}$ norms, by exponentially rescaling the measure in both the range ($p$) and the domain ($q$). The Lorentz norms, like the $L^{p}$ norms, are invariant under arbitrary rearrangements of the values of a function.

== Definition ==
The Lorentz space on a measure space $(X, \mu)$ is the space of extended-complex-valued measurable functions $f:X\rightarrow \mathbb{\overline{C}}$ such that the following quasinorm is finite

$$\|f\|_{L^{p,q}(X,\mu)} = p^{\frac{1}{q}} \left \|t\mu\{|f|\ge t\}^{\frac{1}{p}} \right \|_{L^q \left (\mathbf{R}^+, \frac{dt}{t} \right)}$$

where $0 < p < \infty$ and $0 < q \leq \infty$. Thus, when $q < \infty$,

$$\|f\|_{L^{p,q}(X,\mu)}=p^{\frac{1}{q}}\left(\int_0^\infty t^q \mu\left\{x : |f(x)| \ge t\right\}^{\frac{q}{p}}\,\frac{dt}{t}\right)^{\frac{1}{q}}
= \left(\int_0^\infty \bigl(\tau \mu\left\{x : |f(x)|^p \ge \tau \right\}\bigr)^{\frac{q}{p}}\,\frac{d\tau}{\tau}\right)^{\frac{1}{q}}
.$$

and, when $q = \infty$,

$$\|f\|_{L^{p,\infty}(X,\mu)}^p = \sup_{t>0}\left(t^p\mu\left\{x : |f(x)| > t \right\}\right).$$

It is also conventional to set $L^{\infty,\infty}(X, \mu) = L^{\infty}(X, \mu)$. Given that $L^{\infty}_{\mathrm{w}}(X, \mu) = L^{\infty}(X, \mu)$, we get the following chain of equalities: $L^{\infty,\infty}(X, \mu) = L^{\infty}_{\mathrm{w}}(X, \mu) = L^{\infty}(X, \mu)$. Here, $L^{\infty}_{\mathrm{w}}(X, \mu)$ is the weak Lebesgue space.

== Decreasing rearrangements ==
The quasinorm is invariant under rearranging the values of the function $f$, essentially by definition. In particular, given a complex-valued measurable function $f$ defined on a measure space, $(X, \mu)$, its decreasing rearrangement function, $f^{\ast}: [0, \infty) \to [0, \infty]$ can be defined as

$$f^{\ast}(t) = \inf \{\alpha \in \mathbf{R}^{+}: d_f(\alpha) \leq t\}$$

where $d_{f}$ is the so-called distribution function of $f$, given by

$$d_f(\alpha) = \mu(\{x \in X : |f(x)| > \alpha\}).$$

Here, for notational convenience, $\inf \varnothing$ is defined to be $\infty$.

The two functions $|f|$ and $f^{\ast}$ are equimeasurable, meaning that

$$\mu \bigl( \{ x \in X : |f(x)| > \alpha\} \bigr) = \lambda \bigl( \{ t > 0 : f^{\ast}(t) > \alpha\} \bigr), \quad \alpha > 0,$$

where $\lambda$ is the Lebesgue measure on the real line. The related symmetric decreasing rearrangement function, which is also equimeasurable with $f$, would be defined on the real line by

$$\mathbf{R} \ni t \mapsto \tfrac{1}{2} f^{\ast}(|t|).$$

Given these definitions, for $0 < p < \infty$ and $0 < q \leq \infty$, the Lorentz quasinorms are given by

$$\| f \|_{L^{p, q}} = \begin{cases}
\left( \displaystyle \int_0^{\infty} \left (t^{\frac{1}{p}} f^{\ast}(t) \right )^q \, \frac{dt}{t} \right)^{\frac{1}{q}} & q \in (0, \infty), \\
\sup\limits_{t > 0} \, t^{\frac{1}{p}}  f^{\ast}(t)   & q = \infty.
\end{cases}$$

== Lorentz sequence spaces ==
When $(X,\mu)=(\mathbb{N},\#)$ (the counting measure on $\mathbb{N}$), the resulting Lorentz space is a sequence space. However, in this case it is convenient to use different notation.

=== Definition ===
For $(a_n)_{n=1}^\infty\in\mathbb{R}^\mathbb{N}$ (or $\mathbb{C}^\mathbb{N}$ in the complex case), let $\left\|(a_n)_{n=1}^\infty\right\|_p = \left(\sum_{n=1}^\infty|a_n|^p\right)^{1/p}$ denote the p-norm for $1\leq p<\infty$ and $\left\|(a_n)_{n=1}^\infty\right\|_\infty = \sup_{n\in\N}|a_n|$ the ∞-norm. Denote by $\ell_p$ the Banach space of all sequences with finite p-norm. Let $c_0$ the Banach space of all sequences satisfying $\lim_{n\to\infty}a_n=0$, endowed with the ∞-norm. Denote by $c_{00}$ the normed space of all sequences with only finitely many nonzero entries. These spaces all play a role in the definition of the Lorentz sequence spaces $d(w,p)$ below.

Let $w=(w_n)_{n=1}^\infty\in c_0\setminus\ell_1$ be a sequence of positive real numbers satisfying $1 = w_1 \geq w_2 \geq w_3 \geq \cdots$, and define the norm $\left\|(a_n)_{n=1}^\infty\right\|_{d(w,p)} = \sup_{\sigma\in\Pi}\left\|(a_{\sigma(n)}w_n^{1/p})_{n=1}^\infty\right\|_p$. The Lorentz sequence space $d(w,p)$ is defined as the Banach space of all sequences where this norm is finite. Equivalently, we can define $d(w,p)$ as the completion of $c_{00}$ under $\|\cdot\|_{d(w,p)}$.

== Properties ==
The Lorentz spaces are genuinely generalisations of the $L^{p}$ spaces in the sense that, for any $p$, $L^{p,p} = L^{p}$, which follows from Cavalieri's principle. Further, $L^{p, \infty}$ coincides with weak Lebesgue space $L^{p}_{\mathrm{w}}$. They are quasi-Banach spaces (that is, quasi-normed spaces which are also complete) and are normable for $1 < p < \infty$ and $1 \leq q \leq \infty$. When $p = 1$, $L^{1, 1} = L^{1}$ is equipped with a norm, but it is not possible to define a norm equivalent to the quasinorm of $L^{1,\infty}$, the space $L^{1}_{\mathrm{w}}$. As a concrete example that the triangle inequality fails in $L^{1,\infty}$, consider

$$f(x) = \tfrac{1}{x} \chi_{(0,1)}(x)\quad \text{and} \quad g(x) = \tfrac{1}{1-x} \chi_{(0,1)}(x),$$

whose $L^{1,\infty}$ quasi-norm equals one, whereas the quasi-norm of their sum $f + g$ equals four.

The space $L^{p,q}$ is contained in $L^{p, r}$ whenever $q < r$. The Lorentz spaces are real interpolation spaces between $L^{1}$ and $L^{\infty}$.

=== Hölder's inequality ===
$\|fg\|_{L^{p,q}}\le A_{p_1,p_2,q_1,q_2}\|f\|_{L^{p_1,q_1}}\|g\|_{L^{p_2,q_2}}$ where $0<p,p_1,p_2<\infty$, $0<q,q_1,q_2\le\infty$, $1/p=1/p_1+1/p_2$, and $1/q=1/q_1+1/q_2$.

=== Dual space ===
If $(X,\mu)$ is a nonatomic σ-finite measure space, then
(i) $(L^{p,q})^*=\{0\}$ for $0<p<1$, or $1=p<q<\infty$;
(ii) $(L^{p,q})^*=L^{p',q'}$ for $1<p<\infty,0<q\le\infty$, or $0<q\le p=1$;
(iii) $(L^{p,\infty})^*\ne\{0\}$ for $1\le p\le\infty$.
Here $p'=p/(p-1)$ for $1<p<\infty$, $p'=\infty$ for $0<p\le1$, and $\infty'=1$.

=== Atomic decomposition ===
The following are equivalent for $0<p\le\infty, 1\le q\le\infty$.
(i) $\|f\|_{L^{p,q}}\le A_{p,q}C$.
(ii) $f=\textstyle\sum_{n\in\mathbb{Z}}f_n$ where $f_n$ has disjoint support, with measure $\le2^n$, on which $0<H_{n+1}\le|f_n|\le H_n$ almost everywhere, and $\|H_n2^{n/p}\|_{\ell^q(\mathbb{Z})}\le A_{p,q}C$.
(iii) $|f|\le\textstyle\sum_{n\in\mathbb{Z}}H_n\chi_{E_n}$ almost everywhere, where $\mu(E_n)\le A_{p,q}'2^n$ and $\|H_n2^{n/p}\|_{\ell^q(\mathbb{Z})}\le A_{p,q}C$.
(iv) $f=\textstyle\sum_{n\in\mathbb{Z}}f_n$ where $f_n$ has disjoint support $E_n$, with nonzero measure, on which $B_02^n\le|f_n|\le B_12^n$ almost everywhere, $B_0,B_1$ are positive constants, and $\|2^n\mu(E_n)^{1/p}\|_{\ell^q(\mathbb{Z})}\le A_{p,q}C$.
(v) $|f|\le\textstyle\sum_{n\in\mathbb{Z}}2^n\chi_{E_n}$ almost everywhere, where $\|2^n\mu(E_n)^{1/p}\|_{\ell^q(\mathbb{Z})}\le A_{p,q}C$.

== See also ==
- Interpolation space
- Hardy–Littlewood inequality
