= Karl-Theodor Sturm =

German mathematician

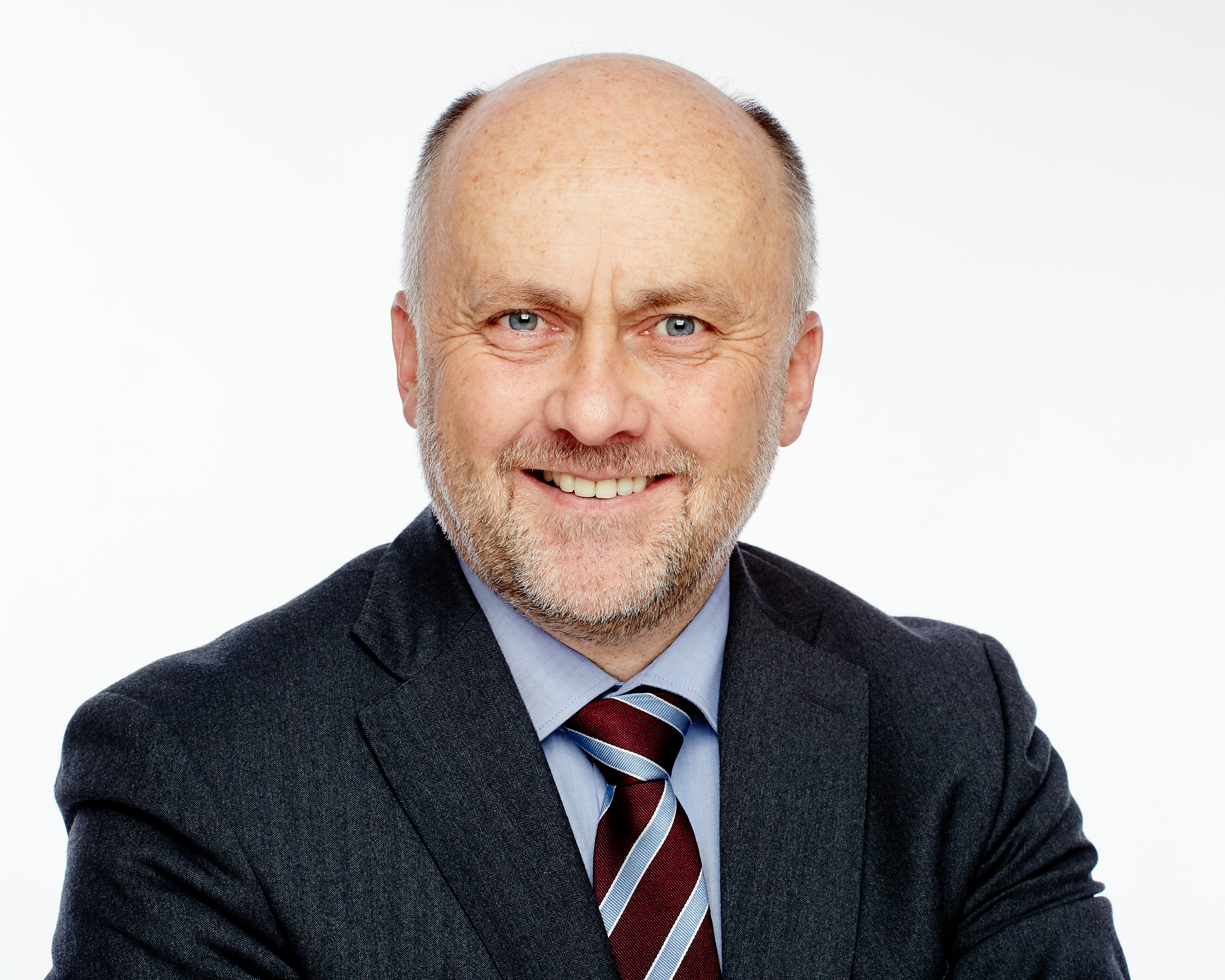
Sturm in 2016

Karl-Theodor "Theo" Sturm (born 7 November 1960) is a German mathematician working in stochastic analysis.

== Life and work ==
After obtaining his Abitur from the Platen-Gymnasium Ansbach in 1980, Sturm began to study Mathematics and Physics at the University of Erlangen-Nuremberg where he graduated in 1986 with the Diploma in Mathematics and the State Examination in Mathematics and Physics. In 1989, he obtained his PhD (with a thesis on „Perturbation of Hunt processes by signed additive functionals“) under the supervision of Heinz Bauer and in 1993 he received his habilitation. Visiting and research positions led him to the universities of Stanford, Zurich, and Bonn as well as to the MPI Leipzig. In 1994, he was awarded a Heisenberg fellowship of the DFG. Since 1997, he is professor of mathematics at the University of Bonn.

From 2002 to 2012, he was vice spokesman and member of the executive board of the Collaborative Research Center 611 "Singular Phenomena in Mathematical Models"; since 2013, he is member of the executive board of the Collaborative Research Center 1060 "The Mathematics of Emergent Effects". From 2007 to 2010, he was managing director of the Institute for Applied Mathematics. Since 2012, he is Coordinator (managing director) of the Cluster of Excellence "Hausdorff Center for Mathematics".

The focus of his research is in stochastic and geometric analysis. He gained particular attention with his work on Analysis on local Dirichlet spaces, 1993-1995, where he introduced geometric concepts for the investigation of stochastic processes and carried over methods from elliptic regularity theory to singular operators on abstract spaces, as well as with his pioneering work on synthetic Ricci bounds for metric measure spaces. The latter was developed in scientific competition with John Lott and Cédric Villani – which in turn also found recognition in the Laudations for Villani’s Fields Medal.

In 2016, he was awarded an ERC Advanced Grant for his research project "Metric measure spaces and Ricci curvature – analytic, geometric, and probabilistic challenges". In 2021, he was Plenary Speaker at the 8th European Congress of Mathematics in Portoroz (Metric measure spaces and synthetic Ricci bounds). In 2022, Sturm was elected a member of the Academia Europaea.

== Selected publications ==
Sturm, K.-T. Super-Ricci flows for metric measure spaces. I, (2016) arXiv:1603.02193.

Erbar, M., Kuwada, K., and Sturm, K.-T. On the equivalence of the Entropic curvature-dimension condition and Bochner's inequality on metric measure spaces, (2013) arXiv:1303.4382.

Sturm, K.-T. The space of spaces: curvature bounds and gradient flows on the space of metric measure spaces, (2012) arXiv:1208.0434.

Huesmann, M., and Sturm, K.-T. Optimal transport from Lebesgue to Poisson. The Annals of Probability 41, 4 (2013), 2426–2478.

Ohta, S.-I., and Sturm, K.-T. Non-contraction of heat flow on Minkowski spaces. Archive for Rational Mechanics and Analysis 204, 3 (2012), 917–944.

Von Renesse, M.-K., and Sturm, K.-T. Entropic measure and Wasserstein diffusion. The Annals of Probability 37, 3 (2009), 1114–1191.

Sturm, K.-T. On the geometry of metric measure spaces II. Acta Mathematica 196, 1 (2006), 133–177.

Sturm, K.-T. On the geometry of metric measure spaces. Acta Mathematica 196, 1 (2006), 65–131.

Von Renesse, M.-K., and Sturm, K.-T. Transport inequalities, gradient estimates, entropy and Ricci curvature. Communications on Pure and Applied Mathematics 58, 7 (2005), 923–940.

Sturm, K.-T. Analysis on local Dirichlet spaces – III. Journal de Mathématiques Pures et Appliquées 75 (1996), 273–297.

Sturm, K.-T. Analysis on local Dirichlet spaces – II. Osaka Journal of Mathematics 32 (1995), 275–312.

Sturm, K.-T. Analysis on local Dirichlet spaces – I. Journal für die reine und angewandte Mathematik 456 (1994), 173–196.
