= Yitzhak Katznelson =

Israeli mathematician (born 1934)

- יצחק כצנלסון
- Born: 1934 (age 91–92); Jerusalem, Mandatory Palestine
- Education: University of Paris
- Awards: Steele Prize (2002)
- Scientific career
- Fields: Mathematics
- Workplaces: Stanford University; Hebrew University of Jerusalem
- Doctoral advisor: Szolem Mandelbrojt
- Doctoral students: Bryna Kra; O. Carruth McGehee

Yitzhak Katznelson (Hebrew: יצחק כצנלסון; born 1934) is an Israeli mathematician.

Katznelson was born in Jerusalem. He received his doctoral degree from the University of Paris in 1956. He is a professor of mathematics at Stanford University.

He is the author of An Introduction to Harmonic Analysis, which won the Steele Prize for Mathematical Exposition in 2002.

In 2012 he became a fellow of the American Mathematical Society.
