= Fundamental lemma of interpolation theory =

In mathematics, particularly in functional analysis, the fundamental lemma of interpolation theory is a lemma that establishes the relationship between different methods of interpolation in Banach spaces.

== Statement ==
The fundamental lemma states the following:

Fundamental lemma of interpolation theory. Let $\bar{A} = (A_0, A_1)$ be a Banach couple and let $a \in \Sigma(\bar{A})$ be such that $\min(1,1/t)K(t,a) \to 0$ when $t \to 0$ or $t \to \infty$. Then for each $\varepsilon > 0$, there exists a representation

$$a = \sum_{n=-\infty}^{\infty} u_n$$

satisfying $u_n \in \Delta(\bar{A})$ (with convergence in $\Sigma(\bar{A})$) and

$$J(2^n, u_n) \leq (\alpha + \varepsilon)K(2^n, a)$$

for all $n \in \mathbb{Z}$, where $\alpha \leq 3$ is a constant.

A stronger version of the fundamental lemma, known as the strong fundamental lemma, was developed by mathematicians Alexander Brudnyi and Krugljak. The strong fundamental lemma states that for mutually closed Banach couples, there exists a decomposition with improved estimates on the norms of the components. Specifically, for $a \in \Sigma^c(\bar{A})$, there exist elements $u_n \in \Delta(\bar{A})$ such that

$$\sum_{n=-\infty}^{\infty} \min{|u_n|{A_0}, t|u_n|{A_1}} \leq (3+2\sqrt{2})K(t,a).$$

This constant $3+2\sqrt{2} \approx 5.8284$ is currently the best known value, as proven by Dmitriev and later independently by Kaijser using different methods.

== History and applications ==
The fundamental lemma was first introduced in the context of classical interpolation theory by mathematicians Jacques-Louis Lions and Jaak Peetre in their 1964 paper Sur une classe d'espaces d'interpolation. The search for optimal constants remains an active area of research.

The fundamental lemma establishes the equivalence of the K-method and J-method of interpolation, which allows mathematicians to choose whichever method is more convenient for a given problem. Tthe lemma has also found applications in the study of K-spaces. In 1981, Brudnyi and Krugljak used the strong fundamental lemma to show that K-spaces have a concrete structure, characterized by lattice norms acting on K-functionals.

In harmonic analysis, the lemma is used to establish properties of Calderón–Mityagin couples, where all interpolation spaces with respect to the couple are K-spaces. The lemma also appears in the theory of operator ideals and has applications in studying the regularity properties of solutions to partial differential equations.

Other variants of the fundamental lemma have been developed for specific applications, including versions involving the E-functional and continuous parameter formulations.

== See also ==
- Sobolev space
