= Bryna Kra =

American mathematician

- Born: Bryna Rebekah Kra; 1966 (age 59–60)
- Citizenship: American
- Education: Stanford University, Harvard University
- Known for: Ergodic theory
- Awards: Levi L. Conant Prize (2010)
- Scientific career
- Workplaces: Northwestern University; University of Michigan
- Thesis: Commutative groups of diffeomorphisms of the circle (1995)
- Doctoral advisor: Yitzhak Katznelson
- Website: www.math.northwestern.edu/~kra/

Bryna Rebekah Kra (born 1966) is an American mathematician and the Sarah Rebecca Roland Professor at Northwestern University. Kra served as the president of the American Mathematical Society from 2023 to 2025. She is a member of the American Academy of Arts and Sciences and the National Academy of Sciences. Her academic work centered on dynamical systems and ergodic theory. In particular Kra has made significant contributions to the structure theory of characteristic factors for multiple ergodic averages. This work has allowed her to address problems in number theory and combinatorics.

== Education and career ==
Kra was born in 1966 in Boston. She graduated with a bachelor's degree from Harvard University in 1988, and obtained her Ph.D. from Stanford University in 1995 under the guidance of Yitzhak Katznelson. She held postdoctoral positions at the Hebrew University in Jerusalem, the University of Michigan, the IHÉS and the Ohio State University before joining the mathematics faculty at Pennsylvania State University as an assistant professor. Since 2004 Kra has been a professor of mathematics at Northwestern University, where she was department chair from 2009 to 2012.

== Book ==
With Bernard Host, Kra is the author of the book Nilpotent Structures in Ergodic Theory (Mathematical Surveys and Monographs 236, American Mathematical Society, 2018).

== Honors ==
In 2010 Kra was awarded the Levi L. Conant Prize for her expository article "The Green–Tao theorem on arithmetic progressions in the primes: an ergodic point of view". In 2006 she was an invited speaker at the International Congress of Mathematicians in Madrid ("From combinatorics to ergodic theory and back again"), and was named an AMS Centennial Fellow the same year. In 2012 she became a fellow of the American Mathematical Society. In 2016 she became a fellow of the American Academy of Arts and Sciences. In 2019, she was elected to the National Academy of Sciences. She was named a 2021 Simons Fellows in Mathematics. Kra was elected to the 2023 class of fellows of the Association for Women in Mathematics "for her vision and work creating programs to support women in mathematics, especially GROW (Graduate Research Opportunities for Women) and AWM student chapters; for her leadership in the mathematics community, including serving on the AWM Executive Committee and serving as president of AMS; and for making advocacy for women a priority throughout her career." Kra was elected president of the American Mathematical Society in 2021 and she served as president from February 2023 to January 2025.

== Family relations ==
Kra is the daughter of mathematician Irwin Kra.
