= George Herbert Swift Jr =

American mathematician

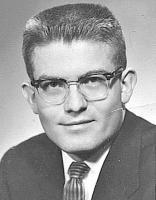
Photo of George Herb Swift Jr in 1954

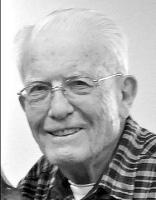
Photo of George Herb Swift Jr in 2012

George Herbert Swift Jr (July 1, 1926, Minot, ND – September 23, 2014) was an American mathematician and computer scientist. Swift attended the University of Oregon, earning a master's degree in mathematics in 1951, before attending the University of Washington, where he earned a PhD in mathematics in 1954 under Edwin Hewitt on irregular Borel measure. He began at Duke University in 1954 as an instructor before being IBM hired him in 1956; he would spend 32 years with the company, where he contributed to the development of the IBM 5100. He retired in 1988 from IBM to teach full-time in mathematics as well as computer science.

== See also ==
- Borel measure
- Borel regular measure

== Publications ==
- Swift, George (1955), "Irregular Borel measures on topological spaces", Duke Mathematical Journal, 22 (3): 427–433, doi:10.1215/s0012-7094-55-02246-8, MR 0072202
- Swift, George (1956), "n-valued irregular Borel measures", Duke Mathematical Journal, 23 (3): 393–407, doi:10.1215/s0012-7094-56-02336-5, MR 0080137
