= Kenneth A. Ross =

American mathematician

- Born: January 21, 1936 (age 90); Chicago, Illinois, US
- Education: University of Utah; University of Washington, Seattle
- Scientific career
- Fields: Mathematics
- Workplaces: University of Oregon
- Doctoral advisor: Edwin Hewitt
- Doctoral students: Jeanne LaDuke

Kenneth Allen Ross (born January 21, 1936) is a mathematician and an emeritus professor of mathematics at the University of Oregon. He served as an associate editor for Mathematics Magazine. He was president of the Mathematical Association of America from 1995 to 1996. He is a recipient of the Charles Y. Hu Award for distinguished service to mathematics.

== Selected publications ==
- Hewitt, Edwin; Ross, Kenneth A. (1963), Abstract harmonic analysis. Vol. I: Structure of topological groups. Integration theory, group representations., Grundlehren der mathematischen Wissenschaften, vol. 115, Berlin-Göttingen-Heidelberg: Springer-Verlag, ISBN 3-540-09434-2, MR 0156915
- Hewitt, Edwin; Ross, Kenneth A. (1970), Abstract harmonic analysis. Vol. II: Structure and analysis for compact groups. Analysis on locally compact Abelian groups., Grundlehren der mathematischen Wissenschaften, vol. 152, New York-Berlin: Springer-Verlag, MR 0262773
- Comfort, W. W.; Ross, Kenneth A. "Pseudocompactness and uniform continuity in topological groups", Pacific J. Math. 16 1966 483–496.
- Ross, Kenneth A. Elementary Analysis: The Theory of Calculus, Springer-Verlag New York, 1980. Second edition, 2013, xi+409 pp.
- Ken Ross, A Mathematician at the Ballpark: Odds and Probabilities for Baseball Fans, Pi Press New York, 2004, xv+189 pp. Second edition, Plume, Penquin Group, 2007, xv+206 pp.
- Ross, Kenneth A.;Charles R. B. Wright (2003). Discrete mathematics (5th ed.). Upper Saddle River, N.J.: Prentice Hall. ISBN 0-13-065247-4.
- López, Jorge M.; Ross, Kenneth A. Sidon sets, Lecture Notes in Pure and Applied Mathematics, Vol. 13. Marcel Dekker, Inc., New York, 1975. v+193 pp.
