= Chung Kai-lai =

Chinese-American mathematician

- 鍾開萊
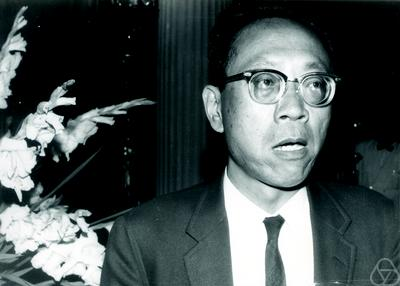
- Born: September 19, 1917; Hangzhou, Zhejiang Province, China
- Died: June 2, 2009 (aged 91); Philippines
- Citizenship: Republic of China, United States
- Education: Tsinghua University; National Southwestern Associated University (BS); Princeton University (PhD)
- Known for: modern probability theory Chung–Erdős inequality
- Scientific career
- Fields: Mathematics
- Workplaces: Tsinghua University; University of Chicago; Columbia University; University of California, Berkeley; Cornell University; Syracuse University; Stanford University; National University of Singapore
- Doctoral advisor: Harald Cramér; John Wilder Tukey
- Doctoral students: Cyrus Derman; J. Michael Steele; Ruth Jeannette Williams

Kai Lai Chung (traditional Chinese: 鍾開萊; simplified Chinese: 钟开莱; September 19, 1917 – June 2, 2009) was a Chinese-American mathematician known for his significant contributions to modern probability theory.

== Biography ==
Chung was a native of Hangzhou, the capital city of Zhejiang Province. Chung entered Tsinghua University in 1936, and initially studied physics at its Department of Physics. In 1940, Chung graduated from the Department of Mathematics of the National Southwestern Associated University, where he later worked as a teaching assistant. During this period, he first studied number theory with Lo-Keng Hua and then probability theory with Pao-Lu Hsu.

In 1944, Chung was chosen to be one of the recipients of the 6th Boxer Indemnity Scholarship Program for study in the United States. He arrived at Princeton University in December 1945 and obtained his PhD in 1947. Chung's dissertation was titled “On the maximum partial sum of sequences of independent random variables” and was under the supervision of John Wilder Tukey and Harald Cramér.

In 1950s, Chung taught at the University of Chicago, Columbia University, UC-Berkeley, Cornell University and Syracuse University. He then transferred to Stanford University in 1961, where he made fundamental contributions to the study of Brownian motion and laid the framework for the general mathematical theory of Markov chains. Chung was later appointed Professor Emeritus of Mathematics of the Department of Mathematics at Stanford.

Chung was regarded as one of the leading probabilists after World War II. He was an Invited Speaker at the ICM in 1958 in Edinburgh and in 1970 in Nice. Some of his most influential contributions have been in the form of his expositions in his textbooks on elementary probability and Markov chains. In addition, Chung also explored other branches of mathematics, such as probabilistic potential theory and gauge theorems for the Schrödinger equation.

Chung's visit to China in 1979 (together with Joseph L. Doob and Jacques Neveu), and his subsequent visits, served as points of renewed exchange between Chinese probabilists and their Western counterparts. He also served as an external examiner for several universities in the Asian region, including the National University of Singapore.

In 1981, with Erhan Cinlar and Ronald Getoor, Chung initiated the "Seminars on Stochastic Processes", a popular annual national meeting covering Markov processes, Brownian motion and probability.

Chung possessed a wide-ranging and intimate knowledge of literature and music, especially opera. He also had an interest in Italian culture and taught himself Italian after he retired. He spoke several languages and translated a probability book from Russian to English.

Chung died of natural causes on June 1, 2009, at the age of 91.

== Selected publications ==
- Elementary Probability Theory; by Kai Lai Chung & Farid Aitsahlia; Springer; ISBN 038795578X.
- A Course in Probability Theory; by Kai Lai Chung.
- Markov Processes with Stationary Transition Probabilities, by Kai Lai Chung.
- Selected Works Of Kai Lai Chung; World Scientific Publishing Company; ISBN 981-283-385-4.
- Green, Brown, & Probability and Brownian Motion on the Line; by Kai Lai Chung; World Scientific Publishing Company; ISBN 981-02-4689-7.
- Introduction to stochastic integration (Progress in probability and statistics); K. L. Chung and R. J. Williams.
- Introduction to Random Time and Quantum Randomness; by Kai Lai Chung & Jean Claude Zambrini; World Scientific; ISBN 978-981-238-388-4.
- Chance & Choice: Memorabilia; Kai Lai Chung.
- Markov Processes, Brownian Motion, and Time Symmetry; (Grundlehren der mathematischen Wissenschaften); by Kai Lai Chung & John B. Walsh.
- From Brownian Motion to Schrödinger's Equation; (Grundlehren der mathematischen Wissenschaften); Kai Lai Chung & Zhongxin Zhao.
- Lectures from Markov Processes to Brownian Motion; (Grundlehren der mathematischen Wissenschaften); by Kai Lai Chung.
