= Erhan Çınlar =

Turkish-American mathematician and academic

- Born: May 28, 1941 (age 85); Divriği, Sivas, Turkey
- Citizenship: Turkish American; Turkey, U.S.
- Education: University of Michigan - Ann Arbor, Michigan
- Known for: Contributions to the theory of stochastic processes and their applications to queueing theory.
- Awards: Institute for Operations Research and the Management Sciences Saul Gass Expository Writing Award for his book Introduction to Stochastic Processes, published in 1975 by Prentice-Hall. (2003)
- Scientific career
- Workplaces: Princeton University; Northwestern University.
- Thesis: Analysis of Systems of Queues in Parallel (1965)
- Doctoral advisor: Ralph L. Disney

Erhan Çınlar (born May 28, 1941, Divriği, Sivas-Turkey) is a probabilist and Professor Emeritus at Princeton University. He was the Norman J. Sollenberger Professor of the department of Operations Research and Financial Engineering (ORFE) at Princeton University.

== Academic life ==
He received a B.S. in Mathematics and a M.S. and Ph.D. in Industrial Engineering and Operations Research, all from the University of Michigan in 1963, 1964 and 1965, respectively. His dissertation, Analysis of Systems of Queues in Parallel, was supervised by Ralph L. Disney.

In 1965, he joined the department of Industrial Engineering and Management Sciences as an assistant professor at Northwestern University. During 1971–1972, he was a visiting professor in the department of Management Science and Engineering at Stanford University, and became full professor of Operations Research in 1972 at Northwestern. He then joined the department of Civil Engineering and Operations Research as a professor at Princeton University in 1985.

== Research areas ==
Çınlar is the co-founder (along with Kai-lai Chung and Ronald Getoor) of the seminar on stochastic processes, an annual conference on probability topics such as Markov processes, Brownian motion, superprocesses, stochastic analysis, and mathematical finance.

== Awards ==
- INFORMS Expository Writing Award
- 2003 class of Fellows of the Institute for Operations Research and the Management Sciences.
