= Chung–Erdős inequality =

In probability theory, the Chung–Erdős inequality provides a lower bound on the probability that one out of many (possibly dependent) events occurs. The lower bound is expressed in terms of the probabilities for pairs of events.

Formally, let $A_1,\ldots,A_n$ be events. Assume that $\Pr[A_i]>0$ for some $i$. Then

$$\Pr[A_1\vee\cdots\vee A_n]
\geq
\frac{
\left(\sum_{i=1}^n \Pr[A_i]\right)^2
}{
\sum_{i=1}^n\sum_{j=1}^n \Pr[A_i\wedge A_j]
}.$$

The inequality was first derived by Kai Lai Chung and Paul Erdős (in, equation (4)). It was stated in the form given above by Petrov (in, equation (6.10)). It can be obtained by applying the Paley–Zygmund inequality to the number of $A_i$ which occur.
