= O. Carruth McGehee =

YouTuber

Oscar Carruth McGehee (cited as O. Carruth McGehee, born 29 November 1939 in Baton Rouge) is an American mathematician, specializing in commutative harmonic analysis, functional analysis, and complex analysis. McGehee was elected Fellow of the American Association for the Advancement of Science in 1984.

== Education and career ==
After graduation from Baton Rouge High School, McGehee matriculated at Rice University, where he received his B.A. in 1961. He became a graduate student at Yale University, where he graduated with M.A. in 1963 and Ph.D. in 1966. His doctoral dissertation was Two Problems of Fourier Analysis on Thin Sets, supervised by Yitzhak Katznelson.

At the University of California, Berkeley, McGehee was an instructor from 1965 to 1967 and an assistant professor from 1967 to 1971. At Louisiana State University (LSU) he was an associate professor from 1971 to 1979 and a full professor from 1979 to 2005, when he retired as professor emeritus. At LSU he was chair of the mathematics department from 1979 to 1984 and dean of the division of academic services from 1986 to 1990.

In 1967–1968 he was a NATO Postdoctoral Fellow at the Faculté des Science d'Orsay, France. He was a visiting professor in autumn 1977 at the University of Illinois Urbana-Champaign and in spring 1978 at the University of Oregon. In 1984 he was elected a Fellow of the American Association for the Advancement of Science.

== Selected publications ==
=== Articles ===
- McGehee, O. Carruth (1966). "Sets of uniqueness and sets of multiplicity". Israel Journal of Mathematics. 4 (2): 83–96. doi:10.1007/BF02937453. ISSN 0021-2172. S2CID 122668952.
- McGehee, O. Carruth (1967). "Certain isomorphisms between quotients of a group algebra". Pacific Journal of Mathematics. 21 (1): 133–152. doi:10.2140/pjm.1967.21.133.
- "A proof of a statement of Banach about the weak$^{\ast}$ topology". The Michigan Mathematical Journal. 15 (2): 135–140. 1968. doi:10.1307/mmj/1028999965.
- Gulick, D.; Lipsman, R.L., eds. (1972). "Helson sets in T^{n} by O. C. McGehee". Conference on Harmonic Analysis. Lecture Notes in Mathematics, vol. 266. Berlin; Heidelberg: Springer. pp. 229–237. doi:10.1007/BFb0059647. ISSN 0075-8434.
- McGehee, O. Carruth (1974). "Fourier transforms and measure-preserving transformations". Proceedings of the American Mathematical Society. 44 (1): 71–77. doi:10.1090/S0002-9939-1974-0338678-8. ISSN 0002-9939.
- with Yitzhak Katznelson: "Conditionally convergent series in $R^{\infty}$". The Michigan Mathematical Journal. 21 (2): 97–106. 1974. doi:10.1307/mmj/1029001253.
- with Louis Pigno and Brent Smith: McGehee, O. Carruth; Pigno, Louis; Smith, Brent (1981). "Hardy's Inequality and the L^{1} norm of Exponential Sums". The Annals of Mathematics. 113 (3): 613–618. doi:10.2307/2007000. ISSN 0003-486X. JSTOR 2007000.

=== Books ===
- with Colin C. Graham: Essays in Commutative Harmonic Analysis. Springer-Verlag. 1979. 2012 pbk reprint
- An Introduction to Complex Analysis. John Wiley & Sons. 2000. ISBN 978-0-471-33233-6. (hardcover 425 pages)
