= Christian Juel =

Danish mathematician (1855–1935)

Portrait of Juel by Christian Neuhaus

Christian Sophus Juel (25 January 1855, Randers – 24 January 1935, Copenhagen) was a Danish mathematician, specializing in geometry.

== Education and career ==
Juel went to school in Svendborg and from 1871 studied at the Technical University of Denmark. From 1876 he studied mathematics at the University of Copenhagen; there he received In 1879 his undergraduate degree in mathematics and in 1885 his Ph.D. (promotion) with thesis Inledning i de imaginaer linies og den imaginaer plans geometrie. From 1894 he was a docent at the Technical University of Denmark, where he became in 1897 a full professor; during this time he also sometimes lectured at the University of Copenhagen.

Juel did research on projective geometry, algebraic curves, polyhedra, and surfaces of revolution from ovals. In projective geometry, he generalized results of Karl von Staudt and independently obtained results similar to those of Corrado Segre. In addition to a monograph on projective geometry, Juel wrote textbooks dealing with stereometry, rational mechanics, and introductory mathematics for chemists.

From 1889 to 1915 he was an editor of Matematisk Tidsskrift. In 1922 he was made a member of the Finnish Academy of Sciences. In 1925 he was made a member of the Norwegian Academy of Sciences and an honorary member of the Danish Mathematical Association. In 1928 he was an invited speaker at the International Congress of Mathematicians at Bologna and gave a talk Beispiele von Elementarkurven und Elementarflächen.

His wife's father was the mathematician and astronomer Thorvald Nicolai Thiele.

Juel was awarded in 1913 a rank of Knight (Ridder) in 1913 and in 1921 a rank of the Cross of Honour (Dannebrogordenens hæderstegn) of the Order of Dannebrog.

== Selected works ==
- Vorlesungen über Projektive Geometrie mit besonderer Berücksichtigung der von Staudtschen Imaginärtheorie, Grundlehren der mathematischen Wissenschaften, Springer Verlag 1934, Online
- Vorlesungen über Mathematik für Chemiker, Kopenhagen 1890
- Elementar stereometri, Kopenhagen, 1896
- Analytisk stereometri, Kopenhagen, 1897
- Ren og anvendt aritmetik, Kopenhagen 1902; 153 pages
- Forlaesinger over rationel mekanik, Kopenhagen 1913, 2nd edition 1920
- Grundgebilde der projectiven Geometrie, Acta Mathematica, vol. 14, 1890, 1–30
- Über die Parameterbestimmung von Punkten auf Curven zweiter und dritter Ordnung. Eine geometrische Einleitung in die Theorie der logarithmischen und elliptischen Functionen, Mathematische Annalen, vol. 47, 1896, 72-104 Online
- Juel, C. (1926). "Über die Kongruenz zweiten Grades und die Kummersche Fläche". Acta Mathematica. 49 (1): 163–181. doi:10.1007/BF02543852.

== Sources ==
- Herbert Oettel in Dictionary of Scientific Biography
