= Victor Pavlovich Palamodov =

Russian mathematician

Victor Pavlovich Palamodov, (Russian: Виктор Павлович Паламодов; born 1938) is a Russian and Israeli mathematician, specializing in analysis.

Palamodov received from Moscow State University in 1959 his Russian candidate degree (Ph.D) under Georgiy Shilov. Palamodov then taught at Moscow State University. Later he taught at Tel Aviv University.

Palamodov has done research on partial differential equations, integral geometry, and complex analysis in several variables (deformations of complex analytic spaces).

In 1966 he was an Invited Speaker of the ICM in Moscow.

== Selected publications ==
- Linear Differential Operators with Constant Coefficients, Grundlehren der mathematischen Wissenschaften, vol. 168, Springer 1970
- Reconstructive Integral Geometry, Birkhäuser 2004
