= George G. Lorentz =

Russian-American mathematician

George Gunter Lorentz (February 25, 1910 – January 1, 2006) was a Russian-American mathematician.

== Biography ==
Lorentz was born in St. Petersburg. His father, Rudolf Fedorovich Lorentz, was a German railway engineer and his mother Milena Nikolayevna Chegodayev came from the Russian nobility. Since his father refused in 1906 to suppress a strike, he was no longer allowed to work on the state railway, so he worked for private railway companies in the Caucasus. The family survived the revolutionary turmoil and civil war near Sochi and then moved to Tbilisi, where he began studying at the Technical University in 1926. From 1928 he studied at the University of Leningrad with the diploma degree in 1931 and the candidate's degree in 1935 (equivalent to a doctorate).

At that time he published several works, also on the topic of his dissertation, Bernstein polynomials. After that, he was a lecturer in Leningrad. After the German occupation of the Leningrad area, he was first evacuated to the Caucasus, where he was captured by the German occupation and classified as a German with his family in a camp in Poland. He sent mathematical work to Konrad Knopp at the University of Tübingen, where he received his doctorate in 1944 under Knopp, with thesis Einige Fragen der Limitierungstheorie (Some questions of limitation theory).

After the war, he was stateless for over ten years. He habilitated in Tübingen and taught from 1946 to 1948 at the University of Frankfurt and 1948/49 as honorary professor in Tübingen. In 1949, he emigrated to Canada and became an assistant, and then assistant professor, at the University of Toronto. From 1953 to 1958 he was a professor at Wayne State University and from 1958 to 1969 at Syracuse University. From 1969 to his retirement in 1980, he was a professor at the University of Texas at Austin.

He dealt with analysis, specifically approximation theory, interpolation theory of operators, and functional analysis.

In 1972 he was awarded honorary doctor in Tübingen, and 1996 in Würzburg. In 1973 he received the Humboldt Research Award.

His doctoral students include Paul Butzer. His son Rudolph Lorentz was a Professor of Mathematics at Texas A & M University.

In 1942, he married Tatiana (née Belikova), and they had five children. He was a passionate chess player and traveled to chess tournaments. He died in Chico, California.

== Bibliography ==
- with Ronald DeVore, Constructive approximation, Springer Verlag 1993
- with Manfred von Golitschek, and Yuli Makovoz: Constructive approximation: advanced problems, Springer Verlag 1996
- Approximation of Functions, Holt, Rinehart and Winston 1966, New York: Chelsea, (2. ed), 1986
- Bernstein Polynomials, University of Toronto Press 1953, Chelsea 1986
- with K. Jetter, and S.D. Riemenschneider Birkhoff Interpolation, Cambridge University Press 1984
- Mathematics from Leningrad to Austin: George G. Lorentz’ selected works in real, functional, and numerical analysis, 2 volumes, Birkhäuser 1997 (editors: George G. Lorentz, and Rudolph Lorentz)

== See also ==
- Lorentz space
