= Gustav Doetsch =

German mathematician (1892–1977)

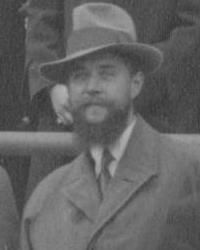
- Gustav Doetsch (Jena, 1930)
- Born: 29 November 1892; Cologne, German Empire
- Died: 9 June 1977 (aged 84); Freiburg, West Germany
- Education: University of Göttingen; Technical University of Hannover
- Known for: Theory and application of the Laplace transform
- Scientific career
- Fields: Mathematics
- Workplaces: University of Halle; University of Freiburg

Gustav Doetsch (29 November 1892 – 9 June 1977) was a German mathematician best known for his research on the Laplace transform. He was also a decorated veteran of the First World War, and a pacifist who later supported national socialism.

== Early life ==
Doetsch was born into a strict Catholic family on 29 November 1892 in Cologne. From 1904 to 1911, he attended Wohler High School in Frankfurt, going on to attend the University of Göttingen, the Ludwig-Maximilians-Universität München, and the Friedrich Wilhelm University of Berlin between 1911 and 1914, studying mathematics, physics and philosophy.

=== World War One ===
With the outbreak of World War I, his studies were interrupted when he joined the army in October 1914. Serving in the infantry for two years, in 1916 he moved to the air force where he served as an aerial observer. In 1918, he was discharged, having received the Iron Cross and position of second-lieutenant.

=== Completion of studies ===
He returned to his studies, completing his doctorate at Göttingen in 1920 with the thesis Eine neue Verallgemeinerung der Borelschen Summabilitätstheorie der divergenten Reihen (transl. A new generalization of Borel summability theory of a divergent series). In 1921 he completed his habilitation thesis at the Technical University of Hannover.

== Academia ==
From 1922 to 1924, he lectured at the University of Halle. Following that he became a professor at the Technische Hochschule Stuttgart. He was offered the chair of mathematics position at the University of Greifswald and the University of Giessen, which he declined, before accepting the mathematics chair position at the University of Freiburg in 1931.

=== Modern Laplace transform ===
The modern theory of the Laplace transform is found in Doetsch's 1937 work Theorie und Anwendung der Laplace-Transformation (transl. Theory and application of the Laplace transformation) which was well-received internationally. This exposition is the culmination of the many years Doetsch spent establishing a rigorous basis for the Laplace transform, which he covered in terms of modern functional analysis. This and his other books on the subject became standard texts throughout the world, translated into several languages. His texts were the first to apply the Laplace transform to engineering.

== Nazi support ==
Following World War I, Doetsch adopted pacifist beliefs, joining the Peace Association of German Catholics from 1926 to 1928 and the German Peace Society from 1926 to 1930. However, after the National Socialists assumed power in 1933, he was described as having become "110% Nazi." The policies of the Nazis began to have an effect on academia in Germany, where Jewish intellectuals were targeted for dismissal. Doetsch approved of the dismissal of colleagues he had at one time collaborated with, such as Edmund Landau, who was his professor when he earned his doctorate at Göttingen, and Felix Bernstein, with whom he had spent much time while researching the Laplace transform.

Doetsch advocated an "appropriate and purely Aryan representation of Germans" on the editorial board of Compositio, a magazine for which he had been a board member at one time along with Reinhold Baer, Ludwig Bieberbach, Georg Feigl, Heinz Hopf, Alfred Loewy, Richard von Mises, John von Neumann, Wilhelm Suss, and Gábor Szegő.

He would come under scrutiny eventually for his pacifist past, and by 1937 his support for National Socialism waned.

=== World War Two ===
With the outbreak of World War II, Doetsch returned to the Luftwaffe as a captain in 1939, serving in the Reichsluftfahrtministerium. There he was in a leadership role and coordinated mathematical war research. In 1941, he was given the task of creating an institute to apply mathematics to economic and military matters in the Third Reich.

By 1944 he had transferred to Institute for Theoretical Ballistics at the Aviation Research Institute.

== Later years ==
After the war he was suspended from his position at Freiburg, and denied retirement privileges in 1946. He was reinstated to his chair position in 1951, where he would serve ten years, isolated from the rest of the faculty, before retiring in 1961. During this time he completed further literary works, including Handbuch der Laplacetransformation in 1955, Einführung in die Theorie und Anwendung der Laplacetransformation in 1958, and Anleitung zum praktischen Gebrauch der Laplacetransformation in 1961.

He also completed Funktionaltransformationen in 1967.

Doetsch died on 9 June 1977.

== Publications ==
- Theorie und Anwendung der Laplace-Transformation, Berlin 1937
- with Dietrich Voelker: Die zweidimensionale Laplace-Transformation. Eine Einführung in ihre Anwendung zur Lösung von Randwertenproblemen nebst Tabellen von Korrespondenzen, Basel Birkhäuser 1950
- Handbuch der Laplace-Transformation, 3 vols., Birkhäuser, Basel 1950, 1955, 1956
- Einführung in die Theorie und Anwendung der Laplace-Transformation, Birkhäuser 1958, 3rd edn. 1976 (English trans. 1974)
- Anleitung zum praktischen Gebrauch der Laplace-Transformation, 1961, 3rd edn., Springer 1967
- Funktionaltransformationen, in Sauer, R.; Szabó, I. (eds.) Mathematische Hilfsmittel des Ingenieurs, Springer 1967
