= Paul Butzer =

German mathematician (1928–2026)

- Butzer in Nice in 1970
- Born: 15 April 1928; Mülheim, Rhine Province, Prussia, Germany
- Died: 9 September 2026 (aged 98)
- Education: Loyola College; University of Toronto; University of Freiburg
- Scientific career
- Fields: Mathematics
- Workplaces: RWTH Aachen University
- Doctoral advisor: George G. Lorentz

Paul Leo Butzer (15 April 1928 – 9 September 2026) was a German mathematician who specialised in analysis (approximation theory, harmonic analysis). He was born in Germany but studied in Montreal and Toronto, Canada. He returned to Germany for his habilitation and then taught at the RWTH Aachen University from 1958. Besides mathematics, he was interested in its history and studied the life and work of mathematicians, beginning in the Carolingian era, publishing a biography of Elwin Bruno Christoffel. Some of his scientific works were translated.

== Life and work ==
Butzer was born in Mülheim on 15 April 1928, the son of an engineer and a mother who studied mathematics at RWTH Aachen University who had met as students. Paul grew up with a younger brother, Karl, who also became a scientist. As opponents of the Nazis, Butzer's parents left Germany with their children in 1937 and moved to England. During World War II, they relocated to Canada, where Butzer attended school in Montreal and studied mathematics at Loyola College (later Concordia University), completing his bachelor's degree in 1948. He then pursued further studies at the University of Toronto, including studying under Harold Scott MacDonald Coxeter and William Tutte, and obtained his Ph.D. in 1951 under the supervision of George G. Lorentz (on Bernstein polynomials). In 1952, he became a lecturer and then an assistant professor at McGill University. In 1955-56, he lived in Paris and then in Mainz. He decided to stay in Germany, where he completed his habilitation at the University of Freiburg, taught in Würzburg, and starting in 1958, at RWTH Aachen University. In 1962, he was appointed professor there. In 1963, he began organizing international conferences on approximation theory at the Oberwolfach Research Institute for Mathematics, later together with Béla Szőkefalvi-Nagy.

In addition to approximation theory and its connections to Fourier analysis and semigroups of operators in Banach spaces, Butzer also worked on probability theory (central limit theorem and related convergence tests issues), sampling theory, and signal analysis.

He also delved into the history of mathematics, particularly in its connection with Aachen. He studied figures such as Peter Gustav Lejeune Dirichlet, Eduard Helly, Eugène Catalan, Pafnuty Chebyshev, Charles Jean de la Vallée Poussin, the history of splines, Otto Blumenthal, mathematics in the Carolingian era, and Elwin Bruno Christoffel, on whom he published a book.

Butzer was a member of the Royal Society of Sciences in Liège and the Royal Belgian Academy of Sciences. He was an honorary member of the Mathematical Society in Hamburg. He received honorary doctorates from three universities: Liège, York, and Timișoara.

Butzer died on 9 September 2026, at the age of 98.

== Publications ==
- Butzer, P. L. (1953). "Linear Combinations of Bernstein Polynomials". Canadian Journal of Mathematics. 5: 559–567. doi:10.4153/CJM-1953-063-7. ISSN 0008-414X.
- Butzer, Paul Leo; Schulte, Hermann (1965). Ein Operatorenkalkül zur Lösung gewöhnlicher und partieller Differenzengleichungssysteme von Funktionen diskreter Veränderlicher und seine Anwendungen (in German). Wiesbaden: VS Verlag für Sozialwissenschaften. doi:10.1007/978-3-663-07066-5. ISBN 978-3-663-06153-3.
- Butzer, Paul P.; Berens, Hubert (1967). Semi-Groups of Operators and Approximation. Berlin, Heidelberg: Springer Berlin Heidelberg. doi:10.1007/978-3-642-46066-1. ISBN 978-3-642-46068-5.
- Butzer, Paul L.; Nessel, Rolf J. (1971). Fourier Analysis and Approximation. Basel: Birkhäuser Basel. doi:10.1007/978-3-0348-7448-9. ISBN 978-3-0348-7450-2.
- Butzer, Paul L.; Trebels, Walter (1968). Hilberttransformation, gebrochene Integration und Differentiation (in German). Wiesbaden: Vieweg+Teubner Verlag. doi:10.1007/978-3-663-07257-7. ISBN 978-3-663-06344-5.
- With Karl Scherer: "Approximationsprozesse und Intepolationsmethoden," BI Hochschultaschenbuch, Mannheim, 1968.
- Butzer, P. L.; Oberdörster, W. (1975). Darstellungssätze für beschränkte lineare Funktionale im Zusammenhang mit Hausdorff-, Stieltjes- und Hamburger-Momentenproblemen (in German). Wiesbaden: VS Verlag für Sozialwissenschaften. doi:10.1007/978-3-322-88178-6. ISBN 978-3-531-02515-5.
- Butzer, P. L.; Fehér, F., eds. (1981). E. B. Christoffel: The Influence of His Work on Mathematics and the Physical Sciences (in German). Basel: Birkhäuser Basel. doi:10.1007/978-3-0348-5452-8. ISBN 978-3-0348-5453-5.
- Butzer, L. (1 January 1982). "Mathematics in the region Aachen-Liège-Maastricht from Carolingian times to the 19th century". Bulletin de la Société Royale des Sciences de Liège (in French). ISSN 0037-9565.
- "Dirichlet and his role in the founding of mathematical physics," Lehrstuhl A für Mathematik, RWTH Aachen, 1983.
- "Mathematics in West and East from the fifth to tenth centuries: an overview," Science in Western and Eastern civilization in Carolingian times. Basel; Boston: Birkhäuser Verlag. 1993. ISBN 978-0-8176-2863-5., pp. 443–481.
- Karl der Große und sein Nachwirken: 1200 Jahre Kultur und Wissenschaft in Europa (in German). Turnhout: Brepols. 1997. ISBN 978-2-503-50674-6.
- Butzer, Paul; Jongmans, François (1999). "P. L. Chebyshev (1821–1894)". Journal of Approximation Theory. 96 (1): 111–138. doi:10.1006/jath.1998.3289.
- "Mathematics at Charlemagne's court and its transmission," Court culture in the early Middle Ages: the proceedings of the First Alcuin Conference. Turnhout, Belgium: Brepols. 2003. ISBN 978-2-503-51164-1., pp. 77–89.
