= Emil Hilb =

German-Jewish mathematician

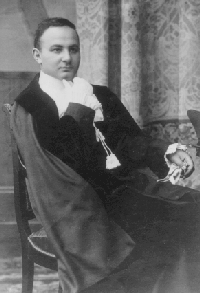
Emil Hilb 1908

Emil Hilb (born 26 April 1882 in Stuttgart; died 6 August 1929 in Würzburg) was a German-Jewish mathematician who worked in the fields of special functions, differential equations, and difference equations. He was one of the authors of the Enzyklopädie der mathematischen Wissenschaften (Encyclopedia of mathematical sciences), contributing on the topics of trigonometric series and differential equations. He wrote a book on Lamé functions.

Hilb obtained his PhD in 1903 under the supervision of Ferdinand von Lindemann. He worked as a high school mathematics teacher in Augsburg until 1906, when Max Noether hired him as an assistant; in 1908 he found a position as a lecturer at the University of Erlangen. He won a position as a professor at the University of Würzburg in 1909, in preference over Ernst Zermelo. His students at Würzburg included Richard Bär, who later became a distinguished experimental physicist, Otto Haupt, and Axel Schur.

== Books ==
- Beiträge zur theorie der lame'schen Funktionen (Contributions to the theory of Lamé functions), München, 1903
- Über Integraldarstellungen willkürlicher Funktionen (On integral representations of arbitrary functions), Teubner, 1908
- Enzyklopädie der mathematischen Wissenschaften (Encyclopedia of the Mathematical Sciences), second volume, edited by H. Burkhardt, W. Wirtinger, R. Fricke, and E. Hilb – downloadable pdf files from the University of Göttingen (German)

== Other biographical sources on Hilb ==
- Haupt, Otto (1933) Emil Hilb, Jahresbericht der Deutschen Mathematiker Vereinigung (Annual Report of the German Mathematical Association), 42, pages 183–198
- Naas, L. and Schmid, H.L. (1961) Neue Deutsche Biographie II (New German Biography II), Berlin (Duncker & Humblot) 1972, page 115 (Otto Haupt) Mathematisches Wörterbuch, Bd. 1, Berlin/Leipzig (Akademieverlag/Teubner), page 729
- Poggendorff, J.C. (1937) biographisch-literarisches Handwörterbuch für Mathematik, Astronomie, Physik, Chemie und verwandte Wissensgebiete, Bd. V. Leipzig-Berlin 1926, page 536, Bd. VI, Leipzig-Berlin 1937, pages 1117
- Reindl, Maria (1966) Lehre und Forschung in Mathematik und Naturwissenschaften, insbesondere Astronomie, an der Universität Würzburg von der Gründung bis zum Beginn des 20. Jahrhunderts, Quellen und Beiträge zur Geschichte der Universität Würzburg (teaching and research in mathematics and natural sciences, especially astronomy, at the University of Würzburg from its founding until the 20th century), Beiheft 1, (Hrsg. v. Otto Volk), Neustadt an der Ausch, (Degener & Co.), pages 79–80
- Strätz, Reiner (1989) Biographisches Handbuch Würzburger Juden (biographical handbook of Jews in Würzburg) 19001945, Würzburg (Ferdinand Schöningh), pages 262–263
