= Christina Birkenhake =

German mathematician (born 1961)

Christina Birkenhake (born 1961) is a German mathematician specializing in algebraic geometry. She is a lecturer at the University of Erlangen–Nuremberg, in the research group on algebra and geometry.

== Education and career ==
After studying mathematics at the University of Münster beginning in 1982, Birkenhake earned her doctorate (dr. rer. nat.) in 1989 from the University of Erlangen–Nuremberg. Her dissertation was Heisenberg-Gruppen ampler Geradenbündel auf abelschen Varietäten [Heisenberg groups of ample line bundles on abelian varieties], and her doctoral advisor was Herbert Lange.

She worked as a research assistant at the University Erlangen-Nürnberg, earning her habilitation there in 1994, until in 2001 she was given a chair in complex analysis at Johannes Gutenberg University Mainz. She returned to Erlangen–Nuremberg as a lecturer in 2003.

== Books ==
With Herbert Lange:

- Complex Abelian Varieties. Berlin Heidelberg: Springer. 1 Dec 2010. ISBN 978-3-642-05807-3.
- Complex Tori. Boston Berlin: Springer Science & Business Media. July 1999. ISBN 978-0-8176-4103-0.
