= K. Chandrasekharan =

Indian politician (1921–2006)

K Chandrasekaran (22 September 1921 – 15 August 2006) was an Indian politician from Kerala who belonged to the Socialist Party. He was a member of the Kerala Legislative Assembly from 1957 to 1959 and 1960 to 1964 for Hosdurg. He represented Kerala state in Council of States, The Rajya Sabha from 1967 to 1970 and 1970 to 1976. Chandrasekharan died on 15 August 2006, at the age of 84.
