= Edwin Hewitt =

American mathematician

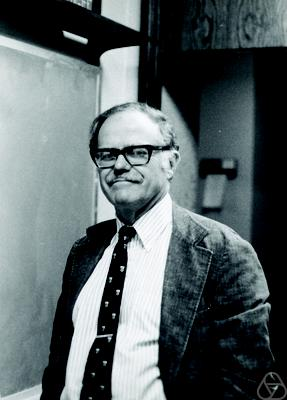
- Born: January 20, 1920; Everett, Washington, U.S.
- Died: June 21, 1999 (aged 79); Seattle, Washington, U.S.
- Education: Harvard University
- Known for: Hewitt–Savage zero–one law
- Scientific career
- Fields: Mathematics
- Workplaces: University of Washington
- Doctoral advisor: Marshall Harvey Stone
- Doctoral students: Kenneth A. Ross; George Herbert Swift Jr

Edwin Hewitt (January 20, 1920, Everett, Washington – June 21, 1999) was an American mathematician known for his work in abstract harmonic analysis and for his discovery, in collaboration with Leonard Jimmie Savage, of the Hewitt–Savage zero–one law.

He received his Ph.D. in 1942 from Harvard University, and served on the faculty of mathematics at the University of Washington from 1954.

Hewitt pioneered the construction of the hyperreals by means of an ultrapower construction (Hewitt, 1948).

Hewitt wrote the 1975 English translation of A. A. Kirillov's 1972 Russian monograph Elements of the Theory of Representations (Элементы Теории Представлений), and co-authored Abstract Harmonic Analysis with Kenneth A. Ross (1st edn., 1st vol. in 1963; 1st edn., 2nd vol. in 1970), an extensive work in two volumes.

== See also ==
- Cohen–Hewitt factorization theorem

== Publications ==
- Hewitt, Edwin (1948). "Rings of real-valued continuous functions. I". Trans. Amer. Math. Soc. 64: 45–99. doi:10.1090/s0002-9947-1948-0026239-9.
- Hewitt, Edwin; Ross, Kenneth A. (1963), Abstract harmonic analysis. Vol. I: Structure of topological groups. Integration theory, group representations., Die Grundlehren der mathematischen Wissenschaften, vol. 115, Berlin-Göttingen-Heidelberg: Springer-Verlag, MR 0156915
- Hewitt, Edwin; Stromberg, Karl (1965), Real and abstract analysis. A modern treatment of the theory of functions of a real variable, New York: Springer-Verlag, MR 0188387
- Hewitt, Edwin; Ross, Kenneth A. (1970), Abstract harmonic analysis. Vol. II: Structure and analysis for compact groups. Analysis on locally compact Abelian groups., Die Grundlehren der mathematischen Wissenschaften, vol. 152, New York-Berlin: Springer-Verlag, MR 0262773
