= Iosif Gikhman =

Ukrainian mathematician

Iosif Ilyich Gikhman
- Born: May 26, 1918; Uman (Cherkasy region, Ukraine)
- Died: September 30, 1985 (aged 67)
- Education: Kyiv State University
- Scientific career
- Fields: Mathematical statistics, Stochastic differential equations, Markovian processes
- Workplaces: Donetsk State University
- Academic advisors: Nikolay Bogolyubov

Iosif Ilyich Gikhman (Ukrainian: Йосип Ілліч Гіхман; May 26, 1918 – July 30, 1985) was a Soviet mathematician.

Gikhman is well known for a comprehensive treatise on the theory of stochastic processes, co-authored with Skorokhod. In the words of mathematician and probability theorist Daniel W. Stroock "Gikhman and Skorokhod have done an excellent job of presenting the theory in its present state of rich imperfection.”

== Career ==
Gikhman graduated in 1939 from the Physics and Mathematics Faculty of Kiev University and began his scientific career in postgraduate studies under the supervision of N.N. Bogolyubov.

After the war, Gikhman worked first at the Kiev Automobile and Highway Institute, and from 1948 to 1966 he worked at the Kiev State University first as an assistant professor, then later as professor, and later as head of the Department of Probability Theory. In 1955, he defended his doctoral dissertation "Markov processes and some problems of mathematical statistics", and in 1959, he received the title of professor.

In 1965, Gikhman was elected a Corresponding Member of the National Academy of Sciences of Ukraine. Since 1966, he had been in charge of the Department of Probability Theory of the Institute of Applied Mathematics and Mechanics of the National Academy of Sciences of Ukraine in Donetsk, and directed the scientific work of the Department of Probability Theory at Donetsk State University.

His scientific works are devoted mainly to various problems of mathematical statistics and the theory of random processes. He co-authored with A.V. Skorokhod several books that were translated into English, and played an important role in the development of modern probability theory and the theory of stochastic processes.

== Selected works ==
- with A. V. Skorokhod: Introduction to the theory of random processes, W. B. Saunders 1969, Dover 1996
- with A. V. Skorokhod: Stochastic Differential Equations, Springer Verlag 1972
- with A. V. Skorokhod: Controlled stochastic processes, Springer Verlag 1979
- with A. V. Skorokhod: The Theory of Stochastic Processes, Springer Verlag, 3 vols., 2004–2007

== See also ==
- List of Ukrainian mathematicians
