= Friedrich Wilhelm Schäfke =

German mathematician and professor of geometry

Friedrich Wilhelm Heinrich Schäfke (21 July 1922 in Berlin, Weimar Germany – 4 April 2010) was a German mathematician and professor of geometry.

== Writings ==
- Mathieusche Funktionen und Sphäroidfunktionen mit Anwendungen auf physikalische und technische Probleme, Springer 1954, with Josef Meixner
- Einführung in die Theorie der speziellen Funktionen der mathematischen Physik, Springer 1963
- Differenzierbare Abbildungen, Köln 1967, with Dietrich Krekel und Dieter Schmdit
- Quasimetrische Räume und quasinormierte Gruppen, Birlinghoven St. Augustin 1971
- Gewöhnliche Differentialgleichungen. Die Grundlagen die Theorie im Reellen und Komplexen, Springer 1973, ISBN 3-540-05865-6, with Dieter Schmdit
- Integrale, 1992, ISBN 3-411-15431-4, with Dieter Hoffmann
