= Konrad Knopp =

German mathematician (1882–1957)

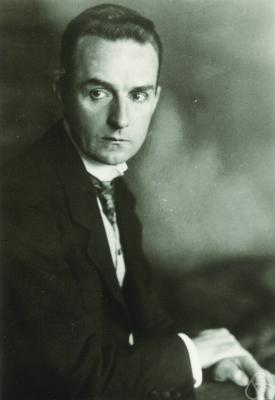
- Born: 22 July 1882; Berlin, German Empire
- Died: 20 April 1957 (aged 74); Annecy, France
- Education: University of Berlin
- Scientific career
- Fields: Mathematics
- Workplaces: University of Tübingen
- Academic advisors: Friedrich Schottky; Ferdinand Georg Frobenius
- Notable students: George Lorentz; Karl Zeller

Osgood curve constructed by Knopp.

Konrad Hermann Theodor Knopp (22 July 1882 – 20 April 1957) was a German mathematician who worked on generalized limits and complex functions.

== Family and education ==
Knopp was born in 1882 in Berlin to Paul Knopp (1845–1904), a businessman in manufacturing, and Helene (1857–1923), née Ostertun, whose own father was a butcher. Paul's hometown of Neustettin, then part of Germany, became Polish territory after the Second World War and is now called Szczecinek. In 1910, Konrad married the painter Gertrud Kressner (1879–1974). They had a daughter Ortrud Knopp (1911–1976), with the grandchildren Willfried Spohn (1944–2012), Herbert Spohn (born 1946) and Wolfgang Spohn (born 1950), and a son Ingolf Knopp (1915–2008), with the grandchildren Brigitte Knopp (born 1952) and Werner Knopp (born 1954).

Konrad was primarily educated in Berlin, with a brief sojourn at the University of Lausanne in 1901 for a single semester, before settling at the University of Berlin, where he remained for his doctoral studies. His doctoral thesis, entitled Grenzwerte von Reihen bei der Annäherung an die Konvergenzgrenze, was supervised by Schottky and Frobenius; he received his PhD in 1907.

== Travels, teaching, and military career ==
Knopp traveled widely in Asia, taking teaching jobs in Nagasaki, Japan (1908-9), at the commercial college, and in Qingdao, China (1910–11), at the German-Chinese college there, and spending some time in India and China following his stay in Japan. His wedding to Kressner, the daughter of Colonel Karl Kressner and Hedwig Rebling, took place in Germany between these periods. After Qingdao he returned to Germany for good and taught at military academies while writing his habilitation thesis for Berlin University.

During the First World War he was an officer and was wounded at the beginning of the war, which resulted in his discharge from the army; by the autumn of 1914 he was teaching at Berlin University. In the following year he was appointed as an extraordinary professor at the University of Königsberg, becoming an ordinary professor there in 1919. In 1926 he accepted a professorship at University of Tübingen as the chair of mathematics, and remained there until his retirement in 1950.

== Publications and editions ==
=== Articles ===
Selected articles of Knopp include:

- Knopp, Konrad (1916). "Bemerkungen zur Struktur einer linearen perfekten nirgends dichten Punktmenge". Math. Ann. (in German). 77 (3): 438–451. doi:10.1007/BF01475872. S2CID 121685956.
- Knopp, Konrad (1918). "Ein einfaches Verfahren zur Bildüng stetiger nirgends differenzierbarer Funktionen". Math. Z. (in German). 2 (1–2): 1–26. doi:10.1007/BF01212897. S2CID 121100303.
- Knopp, Konrad (1920). "Mittelwertbildung und Reihentransformation". Math. Z. (in German). 6 (1–2): 118–123. doi:10.1007/BF01202996. S2CID 120094567.
- Knopp, Konrad (1923). "Über das Eulersche Summierungsverfahren". Math. Z. (in German). 18 (1): 125–156. doi:10.1007/BF01192401. S2CID 124268769.
- Knopp, Konrad (1930). "Zur Theorie der Limitierungsverfahren". Math. Z. (in German). 31 (1): 97–172, 276–305. doi:10.1007/BF01246399. S2CID 124089817.
- Knopp, Konrad (1935). "Über die maximalen Abstände und Verhältnisse verschiedener Mittelwerte". Math. Z. (in German). 39 (1): 768–776. doi:10.1007/BF01201392. S2CID 120268376.

In 1918, Knopp was one of the co-founders of the journal Mathematische Zeitschrift (in which the majority of his above-cited articles are published). He was the editor of the journal from 1934 to 1952.

After retirement Knopp continued to do mathematics, publishing for example

- Knopp, Konrad (1952). "Zwei Abelsche Sätze". Acad. Serbe Sci. Publ. Inst. Math. 4: 89–94.

and delivering the lecture Folgenräume und Limitierungsverfahren at the first meeting of the International Mathematics Union in 1952.

=== Books ===
Knopp's mathematical research was on "generalized limits" and he wrote two books on sequences and series:

- Knopp, Konrad (1956). Infinite Sequences and Series. Dover Publications. ISBN 978-0-486-60153-3.
- Knopp, Konrad (1990). Theory and Application of Infinite Series. Dover Publications. ISBN 978-0-486-66165-0.

He also authored two texts on functions of a complex variable as well as a problem book:

- Knopp, Konrad (1996). Theory of Functions. Dover Publications. ISBN 978-0-486-69219-7.
- Knopp, Konrad (1952). Elements of the Theory of Functions. Dover Publications. ISBN 978-0-486-60154-0.
- Knopp, Konrad (2000). Problem Book in the Theory of Functions. Dover Publications. ISBN 978-0-486-41451-5.

He also produced the sixth edition of the three-volume work (a fourth volume was later added by Friedrich Lösch in 1980):

- von Mangoldt, Hans (1990). Höhere Mathematik: eine Einführung für Studierende und zum Selbststudium. ed. Konrad Knopp (6th ed.) (17th ed.). Stuttgart: S. Hirzel Verlag. ISBN 978-3-7776-0463-3.

== See also ==
- Osgood curve
- Riemann zeta function
