= Robert Sauer (mathematician) =

German mathematician

Rector of the Technical University of Munich
- In office 1954–1956
- Preceded by: August Rucker
- Succeeded by: Ernst Schmidt

Personal details
- Born: 16 September 1898 Pommersfelden, Kingdom of Bavaria, German Empire
- Died: 22 August 1970 (aged 71) Munich, Bavaria, West Germany
- Education: Technical University of Munich
- Scientific career
- Thesis: Über eine Raumeinteilung, erzeugt durch ein Ebenensystem von der Art, dass je vier Ebenen durch einen Punkt gehen (1925)
- Doctoral advisor: Sebastian Finsterwalder
- Doctoral students: Hans Jörg Stetter

Robert Max Friedrich Sauer (16 September 1898 – 22 August 1970) was a German mathematician. He was rector of the Technical University of Munich from 1954 to 1956 and president of the Bavarian Academy of Sciences and Humanities from 1964 to 1970.

== Early life ==
After graduating from high school in Bamberg and completing his military service in World War I as a non-commissioned officer in the artillery, Sauer studied mathematics and physics at the Technical University of Munich from 1919. In 1925 he received his doctorate.

== Career ==
After his habilitation in 1926 he taught at the university as lecturer for descriptive geometry. In 1932 he became associate professor and in 1937 full professor of applied mathematics and descriptive geometry at the TH Aachen.

During this time, Sauer joined the Nazi Party and became involved in the National Socialist German Lecturers League. Sauer was appointed dean, in part because of his party affiliation.

During World War II he worked on ballistics and supersonic gas dynamics, constructing analog computers to solve the differential equations involved. He was intensively supported by his friend, the mathematician Franz Krauß, who also taught in Aachen. These calculations were related to the calculation of the trajectories of V-1 and V-2 rockets sent to London. In 1944, he became a professor at the TH Karlsruhe.

After the end of the war, he was removed from office by the US occupying forces. In return, the French made him an offer to work for the French government in ballistic research. Sauer was soon also employed by the U.S. government in the field of ballistic research.

In 1948, he became a professor at the Technical University of Munich and director of the Mathematical Institute - especially at the instigation of his friend Josef Lense. From 1954 to 1956, he was rector of university.

In 1950, he became a member of the Bavarian Academy of Sciences and was its president from 1964 to 1970. It endowed the Robert Sauer Prize in his honor. In 1962, he was elected a member of the German National Academy of Sciences Leopoldina.
