= Otto Haupt =

German mathematician

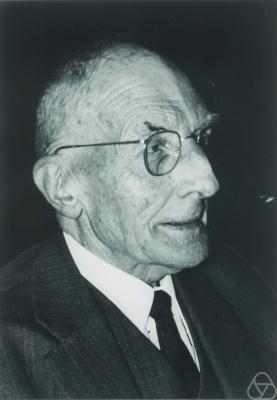
Otto Haupt.

Otto Haupt (born 5 March 1887 in Würzburg; died 10 November 1988 in Bad Soden) was a German mathematician.

== Biography ==
Haupt obtained his PhD in 1911 under the supervision of Georg Rost and Emil Hilb at the University of Würzburg, and became a professor at the University of Erlangen-Nuremberg. He retired from teaching in 1953, but continued his mathematical research for many subsequent years.

Since 1918 he was married to Edith Hughes. Despite her Jewish ancestry, she survived the Nazi period unharmed in Erlangen, and lived to 1981.

== Research and publications ==
Haupt specialized in geometry and real analysis; many of his research publications related to the four-vertex theorem on local minima and maxima of curvature. He also wrote textbooks on algebra and calculus.

== Awards and honors ==
In 1987, his centenary year, a birthday conference was given in his honor at the University of Erlangen.

He was awarded honorary doctorates from the University of Bonn, the University of Nantes and the University of Würzburg.
