= Function space =

Set of functions between two fixed sets

In mathematics, a function space is a set of functions between two fixed sets. Often, the domain and/or codomain will have additional structure which is inherited by the function space. For example, the set of functions from any set X into a vector space has a natural vector space structure given by pointwise addition and scalar multiplication. In other scenarios, the function space might inherit a topological or metric structure, hence the name function space. Often in mathematical jargon, especially in analysis or geometry, a function could refer to a map of the form $X\to \R$ or $X\to \C$ where $X$ is the space in question. Whilst other maps of the form $X\to Y$ between any two spaces are simply referred to as maps. Example of this can be the space of compactly supported functions on a topological space. However in a larger context a function space could just consist of a set of functions (set theoretically) equipped with possibly some extra structure.

== In linear algebra ==
Let F be a field and let X be any set. The set of functions X → F can be given the structure of a vector space over F where the operations are defined pointwise. That is, for any f, g : X → F, any x in X, and any c in F, define
$$\begin{align}
(f+g)(x) &= f(x)+g(x) \\
(c\cdot f)(x) &= c\cdot f(x).
\end{align}$$
When the domain X has additional structure, one might consider instead the subset (or subspace) of all such functions which respect that structure. For example, if V and also X itself are vector spaces over F, the set of linear maps X → V form a vector space over F with pointwise operations (often denoted Hom(X,V)). One such space is the dual space of X: the set of linear functionals X → F with addition and scalar multiplication defined pointwise.

The cardinal dimension of a function space with no extra structure can be found by the Erdős–Kaplansky theorem.

== Examples ==
Function spaces appear in various areas of mathematics:

- In set theory, the set of functions from X to Y may be denoted {X → Y} or Y^{X}.
  - As a special case, the power set of a set X may be identified with the set of all functions from X to {0, 1}, denoted 2^{X}.
- The set of bijections from X to Y is denoted $X \leftrightarrow Y$. The factorial notation X! may be used for permutations of a single set X.
- In functional analysis, the same is seen for continuous linear transformations, including topologies on the vector spaces in the above, and many of the major examples are function spaces carrying a topology; the best known examples include Hilbert spaces and Banach spaces.
- In functional analysis, the set of all functions from the natural numbers to some set X is called a sequence space. It consists of the set of all possible sequences of elements of X.
- In topology, one may attempt to put a topology on the space of continuous functions from a topological space X to another one Y, with utility depending on the nature of the spaces. A commonly used example is the compact-open topology, e.g. loop space. Also available is the product topology on the space of set theoretic functions (i.e. not necessarily continuous functions) Y^{X}. In this context, this topology is also referred to as the topology of pointwise convergence.
- In algebraic topology, the study of homotopy theory is essentially that of discrete invariants of function spaces;
- In the theory of stochastic processes, the basic technical problem is how to construct a probability measure on a function space of paths of the process (functions of time);
- In category theory, the function space is called an exponential object or map object. It appears in one way as the representation canonical bifunctor; but as (single) functor, of type $[X,-]$, it appears as an adjoint functor to a functor of type $- \times X$ on objects;
- In functional programming and lambda calculus, function types are used to express the idea of higher-order functions
- In programming more generally, many higher-order function concepts occur with or without explicit typing, such as closures.
- In domain theory, the basic idea is to find constructions from partial orders that can model lambda calculus, by creating a well-behaved Cartesian closed category.
- In the representation theory of finite groups, given two finite-dimensional representations V and W of a group G, one can form a representation of G over the vector space of linear maps Hom(V,W) called the Hom representation.

== Exponential law ==
For (not necessarily continuous) functions, there is the exponential law that relates functions on a product on one hand and function-valued functions on the other; namely,

$$\operatorname{Fun}(X \times Y, Z) \underset{\sim}\overset{f \mapsto \widetilde{f}}\to \operatorname{Fun}(X, \operatorname{Fun}(Y, Z)), \, \widetilde{f}(x)(y) = f(x, y)$$

is bijective, where $\operatorname{Fun}(X, Y)$ denotes the set of functions from a set $X$ to a set $Y$. (That is, $- \times Y$ is left adjoint to $\operatorname{Fun}(Y, -).$)

In practice, we are usually interested in the analog of the above for continuous functions. In general, however, the exponential law for continuous maps can fail. What we have is this. We write $C(X, Y)$ for the set of all continuous maps from a topological space $X$ to another $Y$. Suppose $X, Y, Z$ are topological spaces. If $C(Y, Z)$ has a coarsest topology such that the evaluation map $e : C(Y, Z) \times Y \to Z$ is continuous, the exponential law holds:

$$C(X \times Y, Z) \underset{\sim}\overset{f \mapsto \widetilde{f}}\to C(X, C(Y, Z))$$

is bijective. But such a coarsest topology may not exist in general (in some cases, a compact-open topology is such a coarsest topology).

== Functional analysis ==
A main theme of functional analysis is to study function spaces and vector spaces with more structure than the bare minimum of linear structure. Specifically, some are topological vector spaces, some are Banach spaces, some are Hilbert spaces, etc. This allows mathematicians to apply intuitions from finite-dimensional vector spaces.

The functional spaces have intricate interrelationships, such as interpolation, embedding, representation, Banach space isomorphism, etc. Many fundamental theorems and constructions in functional analysis deals with their relationships, such as the Riesz representation theorem, the Riesz–Thorin theorem, the Gagliardo–Nirenberg interpolation inequality, the Rellich–Kondrachov theorem, the Hardy–Littlewood maximal function, etc.

Let $\Omega \subseteq \R^n$ be an open subset.

- $B(\Omega)$ bounded functions
- continuous ones
  - $C(\Omega)$ continuous functions endowed with the uniform norm topology
  - $C_c(\Omega)$ continuous functions with compact support
  - $C_b(\Omega)$ continuous bounded functions
  - $C_0(\Omega)$ continuous functions which vanish at infinity; a closed subspace of $C_b(\Omega)$
  - $C^r(\Omega)$ continuous functions that have r continuous derivatives.
- smooth ones
  - $C^{\infty}(\Omega)$ smooth functions
  - $C^{\infty}_c(\Omega)$ smooth functions with compact support (i.e. the set of bump functions)
  - $C^\omega(\Omega)$ real analytic functions
- $L^p(\Omega)$, for $1\leq p \leq \infty$, is the L^{p} space of measurable functions whose p-norm $\|f\|_p = \left( \int_\Omega |f|^p \right)^{1/p}$ is finite
- $\mathcal{S}(\Omega)$, the Schwartz space of rapidly decreasing smooth functions and its continuous dual, $\mathcal{S}'(\Omega)$ tempered distributions
- $D(\Omega)$ compact support in limit topology
- $\text{Lip}_0(\Omega)$, the space of all Lipschitz functions on $\Omega$ that vanish at zero.
- $W^{k,p}$ Sobolev space of functions whose weak derivatives up to order k are in $L^p$
- $\mathcal{O}_U$ holomorphic functions
- $BMO(\Omega)$, space of bounded mean oscillation. Also called John–Nirenberg space
- linear functions
- piecewise linear functions
- continuous functions, compact open topology
- all functions, space of pointwise convergence
- Hardy space
- Hölder space
- Skorokhod space: the space of càdlàg functions.
- Besov space
- Souček space
- Triebel–Lizorkin space
- Barron space

== Uniform norm ==
If y is an element of the function space $\mathcal {C}(a,b)$ of all continuous functions that are defined on a closed interval [a, b], the norm $\|y\|_\infty$ defined on $\mathcal {C}(a,b)$ is the maximum absolute value of y (x) for a ≤ x ≤ b,
$$\| y \|_\infty \equiv \max_{a \le x \le b} |y(x)| \qquad \text{where} \ \ y \in \mathcal {C}(a,b)$$

is called the uniform norm or supremum norm ('sup norm').

== See also ==
- List of mathematical functions
- Clifford algebra
- Tensor field
- Spectral theory
- Functional determinant
- Equicontinuity
- Ascoli's theorem
