= Ehrling's lemma =

In mathematics, Ehrling's lemma, also known as Lions' lemma, is a result concerning Banach spaces. It is often used in functional analysis to demonstrate the equivalence of certain norms on Sobolev spaces. It was named after Gunnar Ehrling. (Note: Fichera's statement of the lemma, which is identical to what we have here, is a generalization (Note: In subchapter 7.3 "Aubin-Lions lemma", footnote 9, Roubíček says: "In the original paper, Ehrling formulated this sort of assertion in less generality.") of a result in the Ehrling article that Fichera and others cite, although the lemma as stated does not appear in Ehrling's article (and he did not number his results).)

== Statement of the lemma ==
Let (X, ||⋅||_{X}), (Y, ||⋅||_{Y}) and (Z, ||⋅||_{Z}) be three Banach spaces. Assume that:

- X is compactly embedded in Y: i.e. X ⊆ Y and every ||⋅||_{X}-bounded sequence in X has a subsequence that is ||⋅||_{Y}-convergent; and
- Y is continuously embedded in Z: i.e. Y ⊆ Z and there is a constant k so that ||y||_{Z} ≤ k||y||_{Y} for every y ∈ Y.

Then, for every ε > 0, there exists a constant C(ε) such that, for all x ∈ X,

$$\| x \|_{Y} \leq \varepsilon \| x \|_{X} + C(\varepsilon) \| x \|_{Z}$$

== Corollary (equivalent norms for Sobolev spaces) ==
Let Ω ⊂ R^{n} be open and bounded, and let k ∈ N. Suppose that the Sobolev space H^{k}(Ω) is compactly embedded in H^{k−1}(Ω). Then the following two norms on H^{k}(Ω) are equivalent:

$$\| \cdot \| : H^{k} (\Omega) \to \mathbf{R}: u \mapsto \| u \| := \sqrt{\sum_{| \alpha | \leq k} \| \mathrm{D}^{\alpha} u \|_{L^{2} (\Omega)}^{2}}$$

and

$$\| \cdot \|' : H^{k} (\Omega) \to \mathbf{R}: u \mapsto \| u \|' := \sqrt{\| u \|_{L^{2} (\Omega)}^{2} + \sum_{| \alpha | = k} \| \mathrm{D}^{\alpha} u \|_{L^{2} (\Omega)}^{2}}.$$

For the subspace of H^{k}(Ω) consisting of those Sobolev functions with zero trace (those that are "zero on the boundary" of Ω), the L^{2} norm of u can be left out to yield another equivalent norm.

== Bibliography ==
- Renardy, Michael; Rogers, Robert C. (1992). An Introduction to Partial Differential Equations. Berlin: Springer-Verlag. ISBN 978-3-540-97952-4.
