= Aubin–Lions lemma =

Mathematical result in the theory of Sobolev spaces

In mathematics, the Aubin–Lions lemma (or theorem) is the result in the theory of Sobolev spaces of Banach space-valued functions, which provides a compactness criterion that is useful in the study of nonlinear evolutionary partial differential equations. Typically, to prove the existence of solutions one first constructs approximate solutions (for example, by a Galerkin method or by mollification of the equation), then uses the compactness lemma to show that there is a convergent subsequence of approximate solutions whose limit is a solution.

The result is named after the French mathematicians Jean-Pierre Aubin and Jacques-Louis Lions. In the original proof by Aubin, the spaces X_{0} and X_{1} in the statement of the lemma were assumed to be reflexive, but this assumption was removed by Simon, so the result is also referred to as the Aubin–Lions–Simon lemma.

== Statement of the lemma ==
Let X_{0}, X and X_{1} be three Banach spaces with X_{0} ⊆ X ⊆ X_{1}. Suppose that X_{0} is compactly embedded in X and that X is continuously embedded in X_{1}. For $1\leq p, q\leq\infty$, let

$$W = \{ u \in L^p ([0, T]; X_0) \mid \dot{u} \in L^q ([0, T]; X_1) \}.$$

(i) If $p<\infty$ then the embedding of W into $L^p([0,T];X)$ is compact.

(ii) If $p=\infty$ and $q>1$ then the embedding of W into $C([0,T];X)$ is compact.

== See also ==
- Lions–Magenes lemma
