= Vladimir Kondrashov =

Russian mathematician

Vladimir Iosifovich Kondrashov (Владимир Иосифович Кондрашов; 2 February 1909 – 26 February 1971) was a Soviet mathematician most well known for proving the Rellich–Kondrachov theorem that shows that the embedding of certain Sobolev spaces into L^{p} spaces is compact. His name has also been transliterated as V.I. Kondrachoff, W. Kondrachov, or V.I. Kondrašov.

== Life ==
Kondrashov was born on 2 February [O.S. 20 January] 1909 in Moscow. He graduated with a PhD from Moscow State University under the supervision of Sergei Sobolev in 1941. As a postdoc at Steklov Institute, where he obtained a DSc in 1950, he organised the Moscow Seminar on the Theory of Functions of Several Variables. For the final 20 years of his life until his death on 26 February 1971, he worked at the Moscow Engineering and Physics Institute.
