= Sergei Sobolev =

Russian mathematician (1908-1989)

- Сергей Соболев
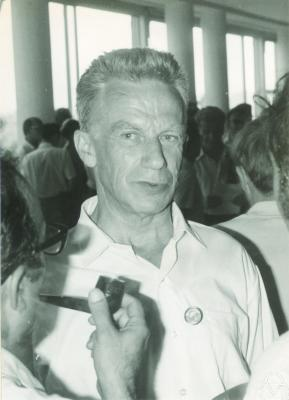
- Sobolev in 1970
- Born: 6 October 1908; Saint Petersburg, Russian Empire
- Died: 3 January 1989 (aged 80); Moscow, Soviet Union
- Education: Leningrad State University, 1929
- Known for: Generalized functions; Riesz–Sobolev inequality; Sobolev conjugate; Sobolev embedding theorem; Sobolev generalized derivative; Sobolev inequality; Sobolev space
- Awards: Lomonosov Gold Medal (1988); USSR State Prize (1983); Hero of Socialist Labour (1951); Stalin Prize (1941, 1951, 1953)
- Scientific career
- Fields: Mathematics
- Workplaces: Steklov Mathematical Institute, Lomonosov Moscow State University, Kurchatov Institute, Novosibirsk State University, Sobolev Institute
- Doctoral advisor: Nikolai Günther

Prof Sergei Lvovich Sobolev, FRSE (Russian: Серге́й Льво́вич Со́болев; 6 October 1908 – 3 January 1989) was a Soviet mathematician working in mathematical analysis and partial differential equations.

Sobolev introduced notions that are now fundamental for several areas of mathematics. Sobolev spaces can be defined by some growth conditions on the Fourier transform. They and their embedding theorems are an important subject in functional analysis. Generalized functions (later known as distributions) were first introduced by Sobolev in 1935 for weak solutions, and further developed by Laurent Schwartz. Sobolev abstracted the classical notion of differentiation, so expanding the range of application of the technique of Newton and Leibniz. The theory of distributions is considered now as the calculus of the modern epoch.

== Life ==
He was born in St. Petersburg as the son of Lev Aleksandrovich Sobolev, a lawyer, and his wife, Natalya Georgievna. His city was renamed Petrograd in his youth and then Leningrad in 1924.

Sobolev studied mathematics at Leningrad University and graduated in 1929, having studied under Professor Nikolai Günther. After graduation, he worked with Vladimir Smirnov, whom he considered as his second teacher. He worked in Leningrad from 1932 and at the Steklov Mathematical Institute in Moscow from 1934. He headed the institute in evacuation to Kazan during World War II. He was a Moscow State University professor of mathematics from 1935 to 1957 and also a deputy director of the Institute for Atomic Energy from 1943 to 1957, where he participated in the Soviet atomic bomb project. In 1958, he led with Nikolay Brusentsov the development of the ternary computer Setun.

In 1956, Sobolev joined a number of scientists in proposing a large-scale scientific and educational initiative for the Eastern parts of the Soviet Union, which resulted in the creation of the Siberian Division of the Academy of Sciences. He was the founder and first director of the Institute of Mathematics at Akademgorodok near Novosibirsk, which was later to bear his name, and played an important role in the establishment and development of Novosibirsk State University. In 1962, he called for a reform of the Soviet education system.

He died in Moscow.

== Family ==
In 1930 he married Ariadna Dmitrievna.

== Publications ==
In 1955 he co-wrote The Main Features of Cybernetics with Alexey Lyapunov and Anatoly Kitov, which was published in Problems of Philosophy.

== See also ==
- Mollifier
- Sobolev mapping

== Bibliography ==
- O'Connor, John J.; Robertson, Edmund F., "Sergei Sobolev", MacTutor History of Mathematics Archive, University of St Andrews
- Sergei Lvovich Sobolev (1908-1989). Bio-Bibliography (S.S. Kutateladze, editor) Novosibirsk, Sobolev Institute (2008), ISBN 978-5-86134-196-7
- Sergei Lvovich Sobolev., in: Russian Mathematicians in the 20th Century (Yakov Sinai, editor), pp. 381–382. World Scientific Publishing, 2003. ISBN 978-981-238-385-3
- Jean Leray. La vie et l'œuvre de Serge Sobolev. [The life and works of Sergeĭ Sobolev]. Comptes Rendus de l'Académie des Sciences. Série Générale. La Vie des Sciences, vol. 7 (1990), no. 6, pp. 467–471.
- G. V. Demidenko. A GREAT MATHEMATICIAN OF 20th CENTURY. On the occasion of the centenary from the birthdate of Sergei Lvovich Sobolev. Science in Siberia, no. 39 (2674), 2 October 2008
- M. M. Lavrent'ev, Yu. G. Reshetnyak, A. A. Borovkov, S. K. Godunov, T. I. Zelenyak and S. S. Kutateladze. Remembrances of Sergei Lvovich Sobolev. Siberian Mathematical Journal, vol. 30 (1989), no. 3, pp. 502–504 doi:10.1007/BF00971511
