= Ehrl =

Ehrl is a German surname. Notable people with the surname include:

- Andreas Ehrl (born 1965), German water polo player
- Wolfgang Ehrl (1912–1980), German wrestler

== See also ==
- Ehrling
