= Cocompact embedding =

In mathematics, cocompact embeddings are embeddings of normed vector spaces possessing a certain property similar to but weaker than compactness. Cocompactness has been in use in mathematical analysis since the 1980s, without being referred to by any name (Lemma 6),(Lemma 2.5),(Theorem 1), or by ad-hoc monikers such as vanishing lemma or inverse embedding.

Cocompactness property allows to verify convergence of sequences, based on translational or scaling invariance in the problem, and is usually considered in the context of Sobolev spaces. The term cocompact embedding is inspired by the notion of cocompact topological space.

== Definitions ==
Let $G$ be a group of isometries on a normed vector space $X$. One says that a sequence $(x_k)\subset X$ converges to $x\in X$ $G$-weakly, if for every sequence $(g_k)\subset G$, the sequence $g_k(x_k-x)$ is weakly convergent to zero.

A continuous embedding of two normed vector spaces, $X\hookrightarrow Y$ is called cocompact relative to a group of isometries $G$ on $X$ if every $G$-weakly convergent sequence $(x_k)\subset X$ is convergent in $Y$.

== An elementary example: cocompactness for $\ell^\infty\hookrightarrow\ell^\infty$ ==
Embedding of the space $\ell^\infty(\mathbb Z)$ into itself is cocompact relative to the group $G$ of shifts $(x_n)\mapsto (x_{n-j}), j\in\mathbb Z$. Indeed, if $(x_n)^{(k)}$, $k=1,2,\dots$, is a sequence $G$-weakly convergent to zero, then $x_{n_k}^{(k)}\to 0$ for any choice of $n_k$. In particular one may choose $n_k$ such that $2|x_{n_k}^{(k)}|\ge \sup_n|x_n^{(k)}|=\|(x_n)^{(k)}\|_\infty$, which implies that $(x_{n})^{(k)}\to 0$ in $\ell^\infty$.

== Some known embeddings that are cocompact but not compact ==
- $\ell^p(\mathbb Z)\hookrightarrow \ell^q(\mathbb Z)$, $q< p$, relative to the action of translations on $\mathbb Z$: $(x_n)\mapsto (x_{n-j}), j\in\mathbb Z$.
- $H^{1,p}(\mathbb R^N)\hookrightarrow L^q(\mathbb R^N)$, $p<q<\frac{pN}{N-p}$, $N>p$, relative to the actions of translations on $\mathbb R^N$.
- $\dot H^{1,p}(\mathbb R^N)\hookrightarrow L^\frac{pN}{N-p}(\mathbb R^N)$, $N>p$, relative to the product group of actions of dilations and translations on $\mathbb R^N$.
- Embeddings of Sobolev space in the Moser–Trudinger case into the corresponding Orlicz space.
- Embeddings of Besov and Triebel–Lizorkin spaces.
- Embeddings of Strichartz spaces.
