= Maximising measure =

Kind of probability measure

In mathematics — specifically, in ergodic theory — a maximising measure is a particular kind of probability measure. Informally, a probability measure μ is a maximising measure for some function f if the integral of f with respect to μ is "as big as it can be". The theory of maximising measures is relatively young and quite little is known about their general structure and properties.

== Definition ==
Let X be a topological space and let T : X → X be a continuous function. Let Inv(T) denote the set of all Borel probability measures on X that are invariant under T, i.e., for every Borel-measurable subset A of X, μ(T^{−1}(A)) = μ(A). (Note that, by the Krylov-Bogolyubov theorem, if X is compact and metrizable, Inv(T) is non-empty.) Define, for continuous functions f : X → R, the maximum integral function β by

$$\beta(f) := \sup \left. \left\{ \int_{X} f \, \mathrm{d} \nu \right| \nu \in \mathrm{Inv}(T) \right\}.$$

A probability measure μ in Inv(T) is said to be a maximising measure for f if

$$\int_{X} f \, \mathrm{d} \mu = \beta(f).$$

== Properties ==
- It can be shown that if X is a compact space, then Inv(T) is also compact with respect to the topology of weak convergence of measures. Hence, in this case, each continuous function f : X → R has at least one maximising measure.
- If T is a continuous map of a compact metric space X into itself and E is a topological vector space that is densely and continuously embedded in C(X; R), then the set of all f in E that have a unique maximising measure is equal to a countable intersection of open dense subsets of E.
