= Jacques-Louis Lions =

French mathematician (1928–2001)

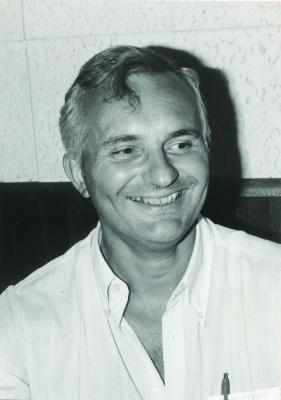
- Lions in 1970

6th President of the French Space Agency
- In office 1984–1992
- Preceded by: Hubert Curien
- Succeeded by: René Pellat

Personal details
- Born: 2 May 1928 Grasse, Alpes-Maritimes, France
- Died: 17 May 2001 (aged 73) Neuilly-sur-Seine, France
- Scientific career
- Education: École normale supérieure University of Nancy
- Known for: Asymptotic homogenization Interpolation space Lion's theorem Lions–Magenes lemma Aubin–Lions lemma Duvaut–Lions formulation
- Awards: W. T. and Idalia Reid Prize (1998); ForMemRS (1996); Harvey Prize (1991); Japan Prize (1991); John von Neumann Prize (1986); ICM Speaker (1958, 1970, 1974); Peccot Lecture (1958)
- Fields: Mathematics
- Workplaces: University of Nancy; École Polytechnique; Collège de France
- Doctoral advisor: Laurent Schwartz
- Doctoral students: Alain Bensoussan; Jean-Michel Bismut; Haïm Brezis; Erol Gelenbe; Roland Glowinski; Michelle Schatzman; Roger Temam

Jacques-Louis Lions (French: [ʒak lwi ljɔ̃ːs]; 2 May 1928 – 17 May 2001) was a French mathematician who made contributions to the theory of partial differential equations and to stochastic control, among other areas. He received the SIAM's John von Neumann Lecture prize in 1986 and numerous other distinctions. Lions is listed as an ISI highly cited researcher.

He has successively taught at several universities, including the prestigious École Polytechnique and Collège de France. He is also the father of mathematician Pierre-Louis Lions, a professor at the Collège de France and recipient of the Fields Medal in 1994.

== Biography ==
Lions was born in Grasse in southern France. He attended École normale supérieure in Paris in 1947 after being part of the French Résistance in 1943 and 1944. Lions received his PhD under Laurent Schwartz. He became a professor of mathematics at the University of Nancy, the Faculty of Sciences of Paris, and the École Polytechnique.

In 1966 he sent an invitation to Gury Marchuk, the soviet mathematician to visit Paris. This was hand delivered by Général De Gaulle during his visit to Akademgorodok in June of that year.

He joined the prestigious Collège de France as well as the French Academy of Sciences in 1973. In 1979, he was appointed director of the Institut National de la Recherche en Informatique et Automatique (INRIA), where he taught and promoted the use of numerical simulations using finite elements integration. Throughout his career, Lions insisted on the use of mathematics in industry, with a particular involvement in the French space program, as well as in domains such as energy and the environment. This eventually led him to be appointed director of the Centre National d'Etudes Spatiales (CNES) from 1984 to 1992.

Lions was elected President of the International Mathematical Union in 1991 and also received the Japan Prize and the Harvey Prize that same year. In 1992, the University of Houston awarded him an honorary doctoral degree. He was elected president of the French Academy of Sciences in 1996 and was also a Foreign Member of the Royal Society (ForMemRS) and numerous other foreign academies.

He has left a considerable body of work, among this more than 400 scientific articles, 20 volumes of mathematics that were translated into English and Russian, and major contributions to several collective works, including the 4000 pages of the monumental Mathematical analysis and numerical methods for science and technology (in collaboration with Robert Dautray), as well as the Handbook of numerical analysis in 7 volumes (with Philippe G. Ciarlet).

His son Pierre-Louis Lions is also a well-known mathematician who was awarded a Fields Medal in 1994. Both father and son have received honorary doctorates from Heriot-Watt University in 1986 and 1995 respectively.

== Books ==
- with Enrico Magenes: Problèmes aux limites non homogènes et applications. 3 vols., 1968, 1970
- Contrôle optimal de systèmes gouvernés par des équations aux dérivées partielles. 1968
- with L. Cesari: Quelques méthodes de résolution des problèmes aux limites non linéaires. 1969
- with Robert Dautray: Mathematical analysis and numerical methods for science and technology. 9 vols., 1984/5; translated from Analyse mathématique et calcul numérique pour le sciences et le techniques by Ian Sneddon
- as editor with Philippe Ciarlet: Handbook of numerical analysis. 7 vols.
- with Alain Bensoussan, Papanicolaou: Asymptotic analysis of periodic structures. North Holland 1978
- with Roland Glowinski and Raymond Trémolières: Numerical analysis of variational inequalities, North Holland 1981 2011 pbk edition
- Contrôlabilité exacte, perturbations et stabilisation de systèmes distribués: Contrôlabilité exacte. Vol. tome 1. Masson. 1988. ISBN 9782225814778.
- Contrôlabilité exacte, perturbations et stabilisation de systèmes distribués: Perturbations. Vol. tome 2. Masson. 1988. ISBN 9782225814747.
- with John E. Lagnese: Modelling Analysis and Control of Thin Plates.

== See also ==
- Ehrling's lemma
- Inverse problem
- Titchmarsh convolution theorem
- Variational inequality
- List of second-generation Mathematicians
