= Triebel (disambiguation) =

Triebel is a municipality in Saxony, Germany.

It is also the former German name of Trzebiel, Poland, formerly in Prussia.

Triebel may also refer to:

- Christian Triebel (1714–1798), German master carpenter
- Frederick Triebel (1865–1944), American sculptor
- Frédéric Triebel (born 1954), French immunologist
- Jördis Triebel (born 1977), German actress
- Triebel-Lizorkin space, in mathematics, a general scale of function spaces
