= Cocompact =

Cocompact may refer to:

- Cocompact group action
- Cocompact Coxeter group
- Cocompact embedding
- Cocompact lattice
