= Lions–Magenes lemma =

In mathematics, the Lions–Magenes lemma (or theorem) is the result in the theory of Sobolev spaces of Banach space-valued functions, which provides a criterion for moving a time derivative of a function out of its action (as a functional) on the function itself.

== Statement of the lemma ==
Let X_{0}, X and X_{1} be three Hilbert spaces with X_{0} ⊆ X ⊆ X_{1}. Suppose that X_{0} is continuously embedded in X and that X is continuously embedded in X_{1}, and that X_{1} is the dual space of X_{0}. Denote the norm on X by || ⋅ ||_{X}, and denote the action of X_{1} on X_{0} by $\langle\cdot,\cdot\rangle$. Suppose for some $T>0$ that $u \in L^2 ([0, T]; X_0)$ is such that its time derivative $\dot{u} \in L^2 ([0, T]; X_1)$. Then $u$ is almost everywhere equal to a function continuous from $[0,T]$ into $X$, and moreover the following equality holds in the sense of scalar distributions on $(0,T)$:

$$\frac{1}{2}\frac{d}{dt} \|u\|_X^2 = \langle\dot{u},u\rangle$$

The above equality is meaningful, since the functions

$$t\rightarrow \|u\|_X^2, \quad t\rightarrow \langle \dot{u}(t),u(t)\rangle$$

are both integrable on $[0,T]$.

== See also ==
- Aubin–Lions lemma

== Notes ==
This lemma does not extend to the case where $u \in L^p ([0, T]; X_0)$ is such that its time derivative $\dot{u} \in L^q ([0, T]; X_1)$ for $1/p + 1/q>1$. For example, the energy equality for the 3-dimensional Navier–Stokes equations is not known to hold for weak solutions, since a weak solution $u$ is only known to satisfy $u \in L^2 ([0, T]; H^1)$ and $\dot{u} \in L^{4/3}([0, T]; H^{-1})$ (where $H^1$ is a Sobolev space, and $H^{-1}$ is its dual space, which is not enough to apply the Lions–Magnes lemma. For this case, one would need $\dot{u} \in L^2([0, T]; H^{-1})$, but this is not known to be true for weak solutions.
