= Sobolev conjugate =

The Sobolev conjugate of p for $1\leq p <n$, where n is space dimensionality, is

$$p^*=\frac{pn}{n-p}>p$$

This is an important parameter in the Sobolev inequalities.

== Motivation ==
A question arises whether u from the Sobolev space $W^{1,p}(\R^n)$ belongs to $L^q(\R^n)$ for some q > p. More specifically, when does $\|Du\|_{L^p(\R^n)}$ control $\|u\|_{L^q(\R^n)}$? It is easy to check that the following inequality

$$\|u\|_{L^q(\R^n)}\leq C(p,q)\|Du\|_{L^p(\R^n)} \qquad \qquad (*)$$

can not be true for arbitrary q. Consider $u(x)\in C^\infty_c(\R^n)$, infinitely differentiable function with compact support. Introduce $u_\lambda(x):=u(\lambda x)$. We have that:

$$\begin{align}
\|u_\lambda \|_{L^q(\R^n)}^q &= \int_{\R^n}|u(\lambda x)|^qdx=\frac{1}{\lambda^n}\int_{\R^n}|u(y)|^qdy=\lambda^{-n}\|u\|_{L^q(\R^n)}^q \\
\|Du_\lambda\|_{L^p(\R^n)}^p &= \int_{\R^n}|\lambda Du(\lambda x)|^pdx=\frac{\lambda^p}{\lambda^n}\int_{\R^n}|Du(y)|^pdy=\lambda^{p-n} \|Du \|_{L^p(\R^n)}^p
\end{align}$$

The inequality (*) for $u_\lambda$ results in the following inequality for $u$

$$\|u\|_{L^q(\R^n)}\leq \lambda^{1-\frac{n}{p}+\frac{n}{q}}C(p,q)\|Du\|_{L^p(\R^n)}$$

If $1-\frac{n}{p}+\frac{n}{q} \neq 0,$ then by letting $\lambda$ going to zero or infinity we obtain a contradiction. Thus the inequality (*) could only be true for

$$q=\frac{pn}{n-p}$$,

which is the Sobolev conjugate.

== See also ==
- Sergei Lvovich Sobolev
- conjugate index
