= Domain (mathematical analysis) =

Connected open subset of a topological space

In mathematical analysis, a domain or region is a non-empty connected open set in a topological space, in particular any non-empty connected open subset of the real coordinate space R^{n} or the complex coordinate space C^{n}. An open ball is a basic example. A connected open subset of coordinate space is frequently used for the domain of a function, but in general, functions may be defined on sets that are not topological spaces.

The basic idea of a connected subset of a space dates from the 19th century, but precise definitions vary slightly from generation to generation, author to author, and edition to edition, as concepts developed and terms were translated between German, French, and English works. In English, some authors use the term domain, some use the term region, some use both terms interchangeably, and some define the two terms slightly differently; some avoid ambiguity by sticking with a phrase such as non-empty connected open subset.

== Conventions ==
One common convention is to define a domain as a connected open set but a region as the union of a domain with none, some, or all of its boundary points. A closed region or closed domain is the union of a domain and its boundary.

Various degrees of smoothness of the boundary of the domain are required for various properties of functions defined on the domain to hold, such as integral theorems (Green's theorem, Stokes theorem), properties of Sobolev spaces, and to define measures on the boundary and spaces of traces (generalized functions defined on the boundary). Commonly considered types of domains are domains with continuous boundary, Lipschitz boundary, C^{1} boundary, and so forth.

A bounded domain is a domain that is bounded, i.e., contained in some ball. Bounded region is defined similarly. An exterior domain or external domain is a domain whose complement is bounded; sometimes smoothness conditions are imposed on its boundary.

In complex analysis, a complex domain (or simply domain) is any connected open subset of the complex plane C. For example, the entire complex plane is a domain, as is the open unit disk, the open upper half-plane, and so forth. Often, a complex domain serves as the domain of definition for a holomorphic function. In the study of several complex variables, the definition of a domain is extended to include any connected open subset of C^{n}.

== Historical notes ==
Definition. An open set is connected if it cannot be expressed as the sum of two open sets. An open connected set is called a domain.

German: Eine offene Punktmenge heißt zusammenhängend, wenn man sie nicht als Summe von zwei offenen Punktmengen darstellen kann. Eine offene zusammenhängende Punktmenge heißt ein Gebiet.

— Constantin Carathéodory, (Carathéodory 1918, p. 222)

According to Hans Hahn, the concept of a domain as an open connected set was introduced by Constantin Carathéodory in his famous book (Carathéodory 1918). In this definition, Carathéodory considers obviously non-empty disjoint sets. Hahn also remarks that the word "Gebiet" ("Domain") was occasionally previously used as a synonym of open set. The rough concept is older. In the 19th and early 20th century, the terms domain and region were often used informally (sometimes interchangeably) without explicit definition.

However, the term "domain" was occasionally used to identify closely related but slightly different concepts. For example, in his influential monographs on elliptic partial differential equations, Carlo Miranda uses the term "region" to identify an open connected set, and reserves the term "domain" to identify an internally connected, perfect set, each point of which is an accumulation point of interior points, following his former master Mauro Picone: according to this convention, if a set A is a region then its closure A̅ is a domain.

== See also ==
- Analytic polyhedron – Subset of complex n-space bounded by analytic functions
- Caccioppoli set – Region with boundary of finite measure
- Continuum (topology) – Nonempty compact connected metric space
- Hermitian symmetric space#Classical domains – Manifold with inversion symmetry
- Interval (mathematics) – All numbers between two given numbers
- Lipschitz domain – Domain in a Euclidean space whose boundary is sufficiently regular
- Support (mathematics) – Inputs for which a function's value is non-zero
- Whitehead's point-free geometry – Geometric theory based on regions
