= Rellich–Kondrachov theorem =

Compact embedding theorem concerning Sobolev spaces

In mathematics, the Rellich–Kondrachov theorem is a compact embedding theorem concerning Sobolev spaces. It is named after the Austrian-German mathematician Franz Rellich and the Russian mathematician Vladimir Iosifovich Kondrashov. Rellich proved the L^{2} theorem and Kondrashov the L^{p} theorem.

== Statement of the theorem ==
Let Ω ⊆ R^{n} be an open, bounded Lipschitz domain, and let 1 ≤ p < n. Set

$$p^{*} := \frac{n p}{n - p}.$$

Then the Sobolev space $W^{1, p} (\Omega)$ is continuously embedded in the L^{p} space $L^{p^*}(\Omega;\mathbb{R})$ and is compactly embedded in $L^q(\Omega;\mathbb{R})$ for every $1 \leq q < p^*$. In symbols,

$$W^{1, p} (\Omega) \hookrightarrow L^{p^{*}} (\Omega)$$

and

$$W^{1, p} (\Omega) \subset \subset L^{q} (\Omega) \text{ for } 1 \leq q < p^{*}.$$

=== Kondrachov embedding theorem ===
On a compact manifold with C^{1} boundary, the Kondrachov embedding theorem states that if k > ℓ and k − n/p > ℓ − n/q then the Sobolev embedding

$$W^{k,p}(M)\subset W^{\ell,q}(M)$$

is completely continuous (compact).

== Consequences ==
Since an embedding is compact if and only if the inclusion (identity) operator is a compact operator, the Rellich–Kondrachov theorem implies that any uniformly bounded sequence in W^{1,p}(Ω; R) has a subsequence that converges in L^{q}(Ω; R). Stated in this form, in the past the result was sometimes referred to as the Rellich–Kondrachov selection theorem, since one "selects" a convergent subsequence. (However, today the customary name is "compactness theorem", whereas "selection theorem" has a precise and quite different meaning, referring to set-valued functions.)

The Rellich–Kondrachov theorem may be used to prove the Poincaré inequality, which states that for u ∈ W^{1,p}(Ω; R) (where Ω satisfies the same hypotheses as above),

$$\| u - u_\Omega \|_{L^p (\Omega)} \leq C \| \nabla u \|_{L^p (\Omega)}$$

for some constant C depending only on p and the geometry of the domain Ω, where

$$u_\Omega := \frac{1}{\operatorname{meas} (\Omega)} \int_\Omega u(x) \, \mathrm{d} x$$

denotes the mean value of u over Ω.

== Literature ==
- Evans, Lawrence C. (2010). Partial Differential Equations (2nd ed.). American Mathematical Society. ISBN 978-0-8218-4974-3.
- Kondrachov, V. I., On certain properties of functions in the space L p .Dokl. Akad. Nauk SSSR 48, 563–566 (1945).
- Leoni, Giovanni (2009). A First Course in Sobolev Spaces. Graduate Studies in Mathematics. 105. American Mathematical Society. pp. xvi+607. ISBN 978-0-8218-4768-8. MR 2527916. Zbl 1180.46001
- Rellich, Franz (24 January 1930). "Ein Satz über mittlere Konvergenz". Nachrichten von der Gesellschaft der Wissenschaften zu Göttingen, Mathematisch-Physikalische Klasse (in German). 1930: 30–35. JFM 56.0224.02.
