= Konrad Jörgens =

German mathematician (1926–1974)

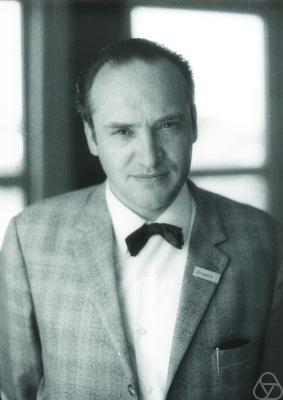
Konrad Jörgens in Memmingen, 1971

Konrad Jörgens (3 December 1926 – 28 April 1974) was a German mathematician. He made important contributions to mathematical physics, in particular to the foundations of quantum mechanics, and to the theory of partial differential equations and integral operators.

== Career ==
He studied at Karlsruhe (1949–51) and Göttingen (1951–54) where he received his doctorate in 1954 under Franz Rellich, with a thesis on the Monge-Ampere equation. From 1954-1958 he was at the Max Planck Institute for Physics and Astrophysics at Göttingen, with an interim stay at New York University (1956–57). From 1958 he was at the Institute of Applied Mathematics at Heidelberg, where he received his habilitation in July, 1959. In June 1961 he was appointed to the newly created professorship of applied and practical mathematics at the same institute. In 1966 he became professor of applied mathematics at Heidelberg.

== Selected publications ==
- Jörgens, Konrad (1958). "An asymptotic expansion in the theory of neutron transport". Comm. Pure Appl. Math. 11 (2): 219–242. doi:10.1002/cpa.3160110206. MR 0103419.
- Jörgens, Konrad; Weidmann, Joachim (1973). Spectral properties of Hamiltonian operators. Lecture Notes in Mathematics. Vol. 313. Berlin–New York: Springer-Verlag. MR 0492941.
- Jörgens, Konrad (1982). Linear integral operators. Surveys and Reference Works in Mathematics. Vol. 7. Boston, Mass.-London: Pitman (Advanced Publishing Program). ISBN 0-273-08523-9. MR 0647629.
