= Robert Strichartz =

American mathematician (1943–2021)

Robert Stephen Strichartz (October 14, 1943 – December 19, 2021) was an American mathematician who specialized in mathematical analysis.

== Early life and education ==
Strichartz was born in New York City on October 14, 1943. He graduated from Bronx High School of Science in 1961 and later earned his B.A. from Dartmouth College in 1963. As an undergraduate, he was notably part of two successful Putnam Competition campaigns for Dartmouth. The Dartmouth team finished fifth in 1961 and second in 1962. To date, no Dartmouth Putnam team has replicated a top five finish. Individually, he was recognized as a Putnam fellow in 1962, and was one of the five highest-ranking individual competitors thus eligible for the $3,000 William Lowell Putnam Scholarship at Harvard University.

Strichartz received his PhD in 1966 from Princeton University under Elias Stein with thesis Multipliers on generalized Sobolev spaces. He was a NATO postdoctoral fellow at University of Paris Sud (Orsay) from 1966 to 1967.

== Career ==
Strichartz's first academic position was at MIT. From 1967 to 1969, he was a C.L.E. Moore Instructor at Massachusetts Institute of Technology. He met his wife, Naomi Richardson, a ballet dancer from Brooklyn and daughter of a mathematician, in 1967. They lived in Boston while he taught at MIT. He then joined the Department of Mathematics at Cornell University, where he taught for more than 50 years. He was appointed assistant professor of mathematics at Cornell in 1969, associate professor in 1971, and full professor in 1977. He mentored nine doctoral students and many undergraduate researchers.

=== Research ===
Strichartz worked on harmonic analysis (including wavelets and analysis on Lie groups and manifolds), partial differential equations, Integral geometry and analysis on fractals. Strichartz estimates are named after him due to his application of such estimates to harmonic analysis on homogeneous and nonhomogeneous linear dispersive and wave equations; his work was subsequently generalized to nonlinear wave equations by Terence Tao and others. He is also known for his analysis on fractals, building upon the work of Jun Kigami on the construction of a Laplacian operator on fractals such as the Sierpinski–Menger sponge.

=== Recognition ===
In 1983 he won the Lester Randolph Ford Award for Radon inversion – variations on a theme. He was elected as a member of the 2017 class of Fellows of the American Mathematical Society "for contributions to analysis and partial differential equations, for exposition, and for service to the mathematical community".

== Personal life and death ==
Strichartz died on December 19, 2021, at the age of 78. He is survived by two children, Jeremy and Miranda.

== Works ==
- Differential equations on fractals: a tutorial. Princeton University Press. 2006.
- "Analysis on Fractals". Notices of the AMS. 46: 1199–1208. November 1999.
- A guide to distribution theory and Fourier transforms. CRC Press. 1994. 2nd edition. World Scientific. 2003.
- The way of analysis. Jones and Bartlett. 2000 [1995]. ISBN 9780763714970.
- Strichartz, Robert S. (1989). "Besicovitch meets Wiener—Fourier expansions and fractal measures". Bull. Amer. Math. Soc. (N.S.). 20 (1): 55–59. doi:10.1090/s0273-0979-1989-15696-6. MR 0948764.
