= Sobolev mapping =

In mathematics, a Sobolev mapping is a mapping between manifolds which has smoothness in some sense. Sobolev mappings appear naturally in manifold-constrained problems in the calculus of variations and partial differential equations, including the theory of harmonic maps.

== Definition ==
Given Riemannian manifolds $M$ and $N$, which is assumed by Nash's smooth embedding theorem without loss of generality to be isometrically embedded into $\mathbb{R}^\nu$ as
$$W^{s, p} (M, N)
:=
\{u \in W^{s, p} (M, \mathbb{R}^\nu) \, \vert \, u (x) \in N \text{ for almost every } x \in M\}.$$
First-order ($s=1$) Sobolev mappings can also be defined in the context of metric spaces.

== Approximation ==
The strong approximation problem consists in determining whether smooth mappings from $M$ to $N$ are dense in $W^{s, p} (M, N)$ with respect to the norm topology. When $sp > \dim M$, Morrey's inequality implies that Sobolev mappings are continuous and can thus be strongly approximated by smooth maps. When $sp = \dim M$, Sobolev mappings have vanishing mean oscillation and can thus be approximated by smooth maps.

When $sp <\dim M$, the question of density is related to obstruction theory: $C^\infty (M, N)$ is dense in $W^{1, p} (M, N)$ if and only if every continuous mapping on a from a $\lfloor p\rfloor$–dimensional triangulation of $M$ into $N$ is the restriction of a continuous map from $M$ to $N$.

The problem of finding a sequence of weak approximation of maps in $W^{1, p} (M, N)$ is equivalent to the strong approximation when $p$ is not an integer. When $p$ is an integer, a necessary condition is that the restriction to a $\lfloor p - 1\rfloor$-dimensional triangulation of every continuous mapping from a $\lfloor p\rfloor$–dimensional triangulation of $M$ into $N$ coincides with the restriction a continuous map from $M$ to $N$. When $p = 2$, this condition is sufficient. For $W^{1, 3} (M, \mathbb{S}^2)$ with $\dim M \ge 4$, this condition is not sufficient.

== Homotopy ==
The homotopy problem consists in describing and classifying the path-connected components of the space $W^{s, p}(M, N)$ endowed with the norm topology. When $0 < s \le 1$ and $\dim M \le sp$, then the path-connected components of $W^{s, p} (M, N)$ are essentially the same as the path-connected components of $C(M, N)$: two maps in $W^{s, p} (M, N) \cap C (M, N)$ are connected by a path in $W^{s, p} (M, N)$ if and only if they are connected by a path in $C(M, N)$, any path-connected component of $W^{s, p} (M, N)$ and any path-connected component of $C (M, N)$ intersects $W^{s, p} (M, N) \cap C (M, N)$ non trivially. When $\dim M > p$, two maps in $W^{1, p} (M, N)$ are connected by a continuous path in $W^{1, p} (M, N)$ if and only if their restrictions to a generic $\lfloor p - 1\rfloor$-dimensional triangulation are homotopic.

== Extension of traces ==
The classical trace theory states that any Sobolev map $u \in W^{1, p} (M, N)$ has a trace $Tu \in W^{1 - 1/p, p} (\partial M, N)$ and that when $N = \mathbb{R}$, the trace operator is onto. The proof of the surjectivity being based on an averaging argument, the result does not readily extend to Sobolev mappings. The trace operator is known to be onto when $\pi_{1} (N) \simeq \dotsb \pi_{\lfloor p - 1\rfloor}(N) \simeq \{0\}$ or when $p\ge 3$, $\pi_{1} (N)$ is finite and $\pi_{2} (N) \simeq \dotsb \pi_{\lfloor p - 1\rfloor}(N) \simeq \{0\}$. The surjectivity of the trace operator fails if $\pi_{\lfloor p - 1\rfloor} (N)\not \simeq \{0\}$ or if $\pi_{\ell} (N)$ is infinite for some $\ell \in \{1, \dotsc, \lfloor p - 1\rfloor\}$.

== Lifting ==
Given a covering map $\pi : \tilde{N} \to N$, the lifting problem asks whether any map $u \in W^{s, p} (M, N)$ can be written as $u = \pi \circ \tilde{u}$ for some $\tilde{u} \in W^{s, p} (M, \tilde{N})$, as it is the case for continuous or smooth $u$ and $\tilde{u}$ when $M$ is simply-connected in the classical lifting theory. If the domain $M$ is simply connected, any map $u \in W^{s, p} (M, N)$ can be written as $u = \pi \circ \tilde{u}$ for some $\tilde{u} \in W^{s, p} (M, N)$ when $sp \ge \dim M$, when $s\ge 1$ and $2 \le sp <\dim M$ and when $N$ is compact, $0 < s <1$ and $2 \le sp <\dim M$. There is a topological obstruction to the lifting when $sp < 2$ and an analytical obstruction when $1 \le sp < \dim M$.
