= Franz Rellich =

Austrian-German mathematician (1906-1955)

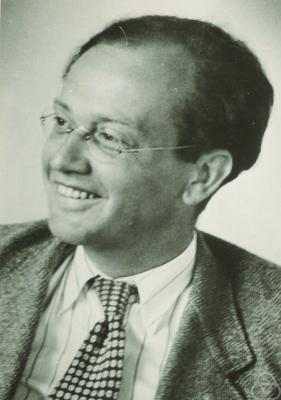
- Born: 14 September 1906; Tramin, County of Tyrol
- Died: 25 September 1955 (aged 49); Göttingen
- Known for: Rellich's theorem Rellich–Kondrachov theorem
- Awards: ICM Speaker (1932, 1950, 1954)

Franz Rellich (September 14, 1906 – September 25, 1955) was an Austrian-German mathematician. He made important contributions in mathematical physics, in particular for the foundations of quantum mechanics and for the theory of partial differential equations. The Rellich–Kondrachov theorem is named after him.

== Biography ==
Rellich was born in Tramin, then in the County of Tyrol. He studied from 1924 to 1929 at the universities of Graz and Göttingen and received his doctor's degree in 1929 under Richard Courant at Georg August University of Göttingen with the thesis about "Verallgemeinerung der Riemannschen Integrationsmethode auf Differentialgleichungen n-ter Ordnung in zwei Veränderlichen" ("Generalization of Riemann's integration method on differential equations of n-th order in two variables"). When in 1933 the great mathematical-physical tradition in Göttingen terminated with the Machtergreifung of the Nazis, Rellich, having taken an active position against Nazism, was among those forced to leave. In 1934 he became Privatdozent in Marburg, in 1942 professor in Dresden, and in 1946 director of the Mathematical Institute in Göttingen, being instrumental in its reconstruction. Heinz Otto Cordes, Erhard Heinz, Konrad Jörgens, and Jürgen Moser were among of his doctoral students. His sister Camilla Juliana Anna was the wife of mathematician Bartel Leendert van der Waerden. Rellich died in Göttingen.

== Contributions ==
Among Rellich's most important mathematical contributions are his work in the perturbation theory of linear operators on Hilbert spaces: he studied the dependence of the spectral family $E_\varepsilon(\lambda)$ of a self-adjoint operator $A_\varepsilon$ on the parameter $\varepsilon$. Although the origins and applications of the problem are in quantum mechanics, Rellich's approach was completely abstract.

Rellich successfully worked on many partial differential equations with degeneracies. For instance, he showed that in the elliptic case, the Monge-Ampère differential equation, while not necessarily uniquely soluble, can have at most two solutions.

Particularly relevant to physics was Rellich's mathematical clarification of the outgoing Sommerfeld conditions.

== Sources ==
- Biographical notes by Göttingen University (in German)
- S. Gottwald, H.-J. Ilgauds, K.-H. Schlote (Hrsg.): Lexikon bedeutender Mathematiker. Verlag Harri Thun, Frankfurt a. M. 1990 ISBN 3-8171-1164-9
