= Besov space =

Generalization of Sobolev spaces

In mathematics, the Besov space (named after Oleg Vladimirovich Besov) $B^s_{p,q}(\mathbf{R})$ is a complete quasinormed space which is a Banach space when 1 ≤ p, q ≤ ∞. These spaces, as well as the similarly defined Triebel–Lizorkin spaces, serve to generalize more elementary function spaces such as Sobolev spaces and are effective at measuring regularity properties of functions.

== Definition ==
Several equivalent definitions exist. One of them is given below. This definition is quite limited because it does not extend to the range s ≤ 0.

Let

$$\Delta_h f(x) = f(x-h) - f(x)$$

and define the modulus of continuity by

$$\omega^2_p(f,t) = \sup_{|h| \le t} \left \| \Delta^2_h f \right \|_p$$

Let n be a non-negative integer and define: s = n + α with 0 < α ≤ 1. The Besov space $B^s_{p,q}(\mathbf{R})$ contains all functions f such that

$$f \in W^{n, p}(\mathbf{R}), \qquad \int_0^\infty \left|\frac{ \omega^2_p \left ( f^{(n)},t \right ) } {t^{\alpha} }\right|^q \frac{dt}{t} < \infty.$$

== Norm ==
The Besov space $B^s_{p,q}(\mathbf{R})$ is equipped with the norm

$$\left \|f \right \|_{B^s_{p,q}(\mathbf{R})} = \left( \|f\|_{W^{n, p} (\mathbf{R})}^q + \int_0^\infty \left|\frac{ \omega^2_p \left ( f^{(n)}, t \right ) } {t^{\alpha} }\right|^q \frac{dt}{t} \right)^{\frac{1}{q}}$$

The Besov spaces $B^s_{2,2}(\mathbf{R})$ coincide with the more classical Sobolev spaces $H^s(\mathbf{R})$.

If $p=q$ and $s$ is not an integer, then $B^s_{p,p}(\mathbf{R}) =\bar W^{s,p}( \mathbf{R})$, where $\bar W^{s,p}( \mathbf{R})$ denotes the Sobolev–Slobodeckij space.
