= Ehrling =

Ehrling is a Swedish surname. Notable people with the name include:

- Cecilia Ehrling (born 1984), Swedish competitive dancer
- Marie Ehrling (born 1955), Swedish executive
- Sixten Ehrling (1918–2005), Swedish music conductor
- Harald Ehrling (born 1995), Swedish music producer and saxophonist

== See also ==
- Ehrling's lemma, equivalence of certain norms on Sobolev spaces
