= Trace operator =

Boundary condition for generalized functions

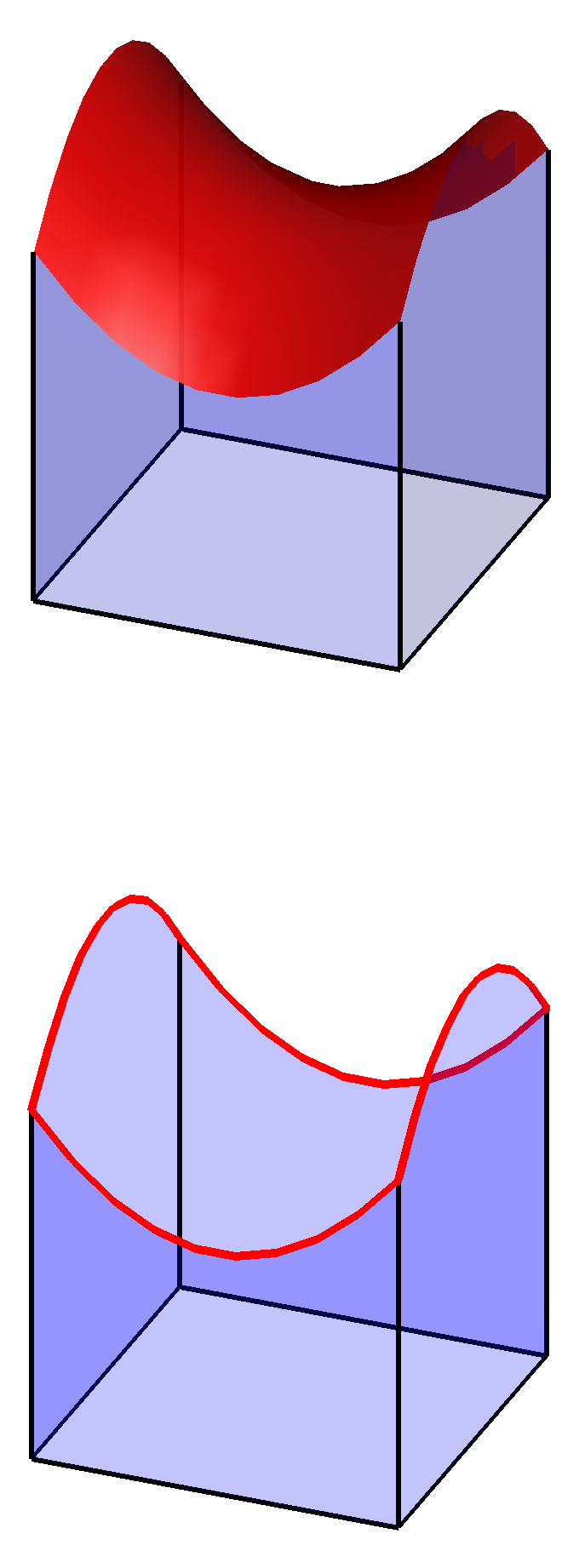
A function defined on a rectangle (top figure, in red), and its trace (bottom figure, in red).

In mathematical analysis, the trace operator extends the notion of the restriction of a function to the boundary of its domain to "generalized" functions in a Sobolev space. This is particularly important for the study of partial differential equations with prescribed boundary conditions (boundary value problems), where weak solutions may not be regular enough to satisfy the boundary conditions in the classical sense of functions.

== Motivation ==
On a bounded, smooth domain $\Omega \subset \mathbb R^n$, consider the problem of solving Poisson's equation with inhomogeneous Dirichlet boundary conditions:

$$\begin{alignat}{2}
-\Delta u &= f &\quad&\text{in } \Omega,\\
u &= g &&\text{on } \partial \Omega
\end{alignat}$$

with given functions $f$ and $g$ with regularity discussed in the application section below. The weak solution $u \in H^1(\Omega)$ of this equation must satisfy

$\int_\Omega \nabla u \cdot \nabla \varphi \,\mathrm dx = \int_\Omega f \varphi \,\mathrm dx$ for all $\varphi \in H^1_0(\Omega)$.

The $H^1(\Omega)$-regularity of $u$ is sufficient for the well-definedness of this integral equation. It is not apparent, however, in which sense $u$ can satisfy the boundary condition $u = g$ on $\partial \Omega$: by definition, $u \in H^1(\Omega) \subset L^2(\Omega)$ is an equivalence class of functions which can have arbitrary values on $\partial \Omega$ since this is a null set with respect to the n-dimensional Lebesgue measure.

If $\Omega \subset \mathbb R^1$ there holds $H^1(\Omega) \hookrightarrow C^0(\bar \Omega)$ by Sobolev's embedding theorem, such that $u$ can satisfy the boundary condition in the classical sense, i.e. the restriction of $u$ to $\partial \Omega$ agrees with the function $g$ (more precisely: there exists a representative of $u$ in $C(\bar \Omega)$ with this property). For $\Omega \subset \mathbb R^n$ with $n > 1$ such an embedding does not exist and the trace operator $T$ presented here must be used to give meaning to $u |_{\partial \Omega}$. Then $u \in H^1(\Omega)$ with $T u = g$ is called a weak solution to the boundary value problem if the integral equation above is satisfied. For the definition of the trace operator to be reasonable, there must hold $T u = u |_{\partial \Omega}$ for sufficiently regular $u$.

== Trace theorem ==
The trace operator can be defined for functions in the Sobolev spaces $W^{1,p}(\Omega)$ with $1 \leq p < \infty$, see the section below for possible extensions of the trace to other spaces. Let $\Omega \subset \mathbb R^n$ for $n \in \mathbb N$ be a bounded domain with Lipschitz boundary. Then there exists a bounded linear trace operator

$$T\colon W^{1, p}(\Omega) \to L^p(\partial \Omega)$$

such that $T$ extends the classical trace, i.e.

$T u = u |_{\partial \Omega}$ for all $u \in W^{1, p}(\Omega) \cap C(\bar \Omega)$.

The continuity of $T$ implies that

$\| T u \|_{L^p(\partial \Omega)} \leq C \| u \|_{W^{1,p}(\Omega)}$ for all $u \in W^{1, p}(\Omega)$

with constant only depending on $p$ and $\Omega$. The function $T u$ is called trace of $u$ and is often simply denoted by $u |_{\partial \Omega}$. Other common symbols for $T$ include $tr$ and $\gamma$.

=== Construction ===
This paragraph follows Evans, where more details can be found, and assumes that $\Omega$ has a $C^1$-boundary. (Note: $C^k$ boundary: We say $\partial U$ is $C^k$ if for each point $x^0 \in \partial U$ there exist $r>0$ and a $C^k$ function $\gamma\colon\mathbb{R}^{n-1} \rightarrow \mathbb{R}$ such that—upon relabeling and reorienting the coordinate axes if necessary—we have: $U\cap B(x^0,r)=\{x\in B(x^0,r)|x_n>\gamma (x_1,\dots,x_{n-1}) \}$) A proof (of a stronger version) of the trace theorem for Lipschitz domains can be found in Gagliardo. On a $C^1$-domain, the trace operator can be defined as continuous linear extension of the operator

$$T:C^\infty(\bar \Omega)\to L^p(\partial \Omega)$$

to the space $W^{1, p}(\Omega)$. By density of $C^\infty(\bar \Omega)$ in $W^{1, p}(\Omega)$ such an extension is possible if $T$ is continuous with respect to the $W^{1, p}(\Omega)$-norm. The proof of this, i.e. that there exists $C > 0$ (depending on $\Omega$ and $p$) such that

$\|Tu\|_{L^{p}(\partial \Omega)}\le C \|u\|_{W^{1, p}(\Omega)}$ for all $u \in C^\infty(\bar \Omega)$,

is the central ingredient in the construction of the trace operator. A local variant of this estimate for $C^1(\bar \Omega)$-functions is first proven for a locally flat boundary using the divergence theorem. By transformation, a general $C^1$-boundary can be locally straightened to reduce to this case, where the $C^1$-regularity of the transformation requires that the local estimate holds for $C^1(\bar \Omega)$-functions.

With this continuity of the trace operator in $C^\infty(\bar \Omega)$ an extension to $W^{1, p}(\Omega)$ exists by abstract arguments and $Tu$ for $u \in W^{1, p}(\Omega)$ can be characterized as follows. Let $u_k \in C^\infty(\bar \Omega)$ be a sequence approximating $u \in W^{1, p}(\Omega)$ by density. By the proven continuity of $T$ in $C^\infty(\bar \Omega)$ the sequence $u_k |_{\partial \Omega}$ is a Cauchy sequence in $L^p(\partial \Omega)$ and $T u = \lim_{k \to \infty} u_k |_{\partial \Omega}$ with limit taken in $L^p(\partial \Omega)$.

The extension property $T u = u |_{\partial \Omega}$ holds for $u \in C^{\infty}(\bar \Omega)$ by construction, but for any $u \in W^{1, p}(\Omega) \cap C(\bar \Omega)$ there exists a sequence $u_k \in C^\infty(\bar \Omega)$ which converges uniformly on $\bar \Omega$ to $u$, verifying the extension property on the larger set $W^{1, p}(\Omega) \cap C(\bar \Omega)$.

=== The case p = ∞ ===
If $\Omega$ is bounded and has a $C^1$-boundary then by Morrey's inequality there exists a continuous embedding $W^{1, \infty}(\Omega) \hookrightarrow C^{0, 1}(\Omega)$, where $C^{0, 1}(\Omega)$ denotes the space of Lipschitz continuous functions. In particular, any function $u \in W^{1, \infty}(\Omega)$ has a classical trace $u |_{\partial \Omega} \in C(\partial \Omega)$ and there holds

$$\| u |_{\partial \Omega} \|_{C(\partial \Omega)} \leq \| u \|_{C^{0, 1}(\Omega)} \leq C \| u \|_{W^{1, \infty}(\Omega)}.$$

== Functions with trace zero ==
The Sobolev spaces $W^{1,p}_0(\Omega)$ for $1 \leq p < \infty$ are defined as the closure of the set of compactly supported test functions $C^\infty_c(\Omega)$ with respect to the $W^{1, p}(\Omega)$-norm. The following alternative characterization holds:

$$W^{1, p}_0(\Omega) = \{ u \in W^{1, p}(\Omega) \mid T u = 0 \} = \ker(T\colon W^{1, p}(\Omega) \to L^p(\partial \Omega)),$$

where $\ker(T)$ is the kernel of $T$, i.e. $W^{1, p}_0(\Omega)$ is the subspace of functions in $W^{1, p}(\Omega)$ with trace zero.

== Image of the trace operator ==
=== For p > 1 ===
The trace operator is not surjective onto $L^p(\partial \Omega)$ if $p > 1$, i.e. not every function in $L^p(\partial \Omega)$ is the trace of a function in $W^{1, p}(\Omega)$. As elaborated below the image consists of functions which satisfy an $L^p$-version of Hölder continuity.

==== Abstract characterization ====
An abstract characterization of the image of $T$ can be derived as follows. By the isomorphism theorems there holds

$$T(W^{1,p}(\Omega)) \cong W^{1, p}(\Omega) / \ker(T\colon W^{1, p}(\Omega) \to L^p(\partial \Omega)) = W^{1, p}(\Omega) / W^{1, p}_0(\Omega)$$

where $X / N$ denotes the quotient space of the Banach space $X$ by the subspace $N \subset X$ and the last identity follows from the characterization of $W^{1, p}_0(\Omega)$ from above. Equipping the quotient space with the quotient norm defined by

$$\|u\|_{W^{1, p}(\Omega) / W^{1, p}_0(\Omega)} = \inf_{u_0 \in W^{1, p}_0(\Omega)} \|u - u_0\|_{W^{1, p}(\Omega)}$$

the trace operator $T$ is then a surjective, bounded linear operator

$$T\colon W^{1, p}(\Omega) \to W^{1, p}(\Omega) / W^{1, p}_0(\Omega)$$.

==== Characterization using Sobolev–Slobodeckij spaces ====
A more concrete representation of the image of $T$ can be given using Sobolev-Slobodeckij spaces which generalize the concept of Hölder continuous functions to the $L^p$-setting. Since $\partial \Omega$ is a (n-1)-dimensional Lipschitz manifold embedded into $\mathbb R^n$ an explicit characterization of these spaces is technically involved. For simplicity consider first a planar domain $\Omega' \subset \mathbb R^{n-1}$. For $v \in L^p(\Omega')$ define the (possibly infinite) norm

$$\| v \|_{W^{1-1/p, p}(\Omega')} = \left( \|v\|_{L^p(\Omega')}^p + \int_{\Omega' \times \Omega'} \frac{ | v(x) - v(y) |^p }{|x - y|^{(1 - 1/p) p + (n-1)}}\,\mathrm d(x, y) \right)^{1/p}$$

which generalizes the Hölder condition $| v(x) - v(y) | \leq C | x - y|^{1-1/p}$. Then

$$W^{1-1/p, p}(\Omega') = \left\{ v \in L^p(\Omega') \;\mid\; \| v \|_{W^{1-1/p, p}(\Omega')} < \infty \right\}$$

equipped with the previous norm is a Banach space (a general definition of $W^{s,p}(\Omega')$ for non-integer $s > 0$ can be found in the article for Sobolev-Slobodeckij spaces). For the (n-1)-dimensional Lipschitz manifold $\partial \Omega$ define $W^{1-1/p, p}(\partial \Omega)$ by locally straightening $\partial \Omega$ and proceeding as in the definition of $W^{1-1/p, p}(\Omega')$.

The space $W^{1-1/p, p}(\partial \Omega)$ can then be identified as the image of the trace operator and there holds that

$$T\colon W^{1, p}(\Omega) \to W^{1 - 1/p, p}(\partial \Omega)$$

is a surjective, bounded linear operator.

=== For p = 1 ===
For $p = 1$ the image of the trace operator is $L^1(\partial \Omega)$ and there holds that

$$T\colon W^{1, 1}(\Omega) \to L^1(\partial \Omega)$$

is a surjective, bounded linear operator.

== Right-inverse: trace extension operator ==
The trace operator is not injective since multiple functions in $W^{1, p}(\Omega)$ can have the same trace (or equivalently, $W^{1, p}_0(\Omega) \neq 0$). The trace operator has however a well-behaved right-inverse, which extends a function defined on the boundary to the whole domain. Specifically, for $1 < p < \infty$ there exists a bounded, linear trace extension operator

$$E\colon W^{1-1/p, p}(\partial \Omega) \to W^{1, p}(\Omega)$$,

using the Sobolev-Slobodeckij characterization of the trace operator's image from the previous section, such that

$T (E v) = v$ for all $v \in W^{1-1/p, p}(\partial \Omega)$

and, by continuity, there exists $C > 0$ with

$$\| E v \|_{W^{1, p}(\Omega)} \leq C \| v \|_{W^{1-1/p, p}(\partial \Omega)}$$.

Notable is not the mere existence but the linearity and continuity of the right inverse. This trace extension operator must not be confused with the whole-space extension operators $W^{1, p}(\Omega) \to W^{1, p}(\mathbb R^n)$ which play a fundamental role in the theory of Sobolev spaces.

== Extension to other spaces ==
=== Higher derivatives ===
Many of the previous results can be extended to $W^{m, p}(\Omega)$ with higher differentiability $m = 2, 3, \ldots$ if the domain is sufficiently regular. Let $N$ denote the exterior unit normal field on $\partial \Omega$. Since $u |_{\partial \Omega}$ can encode differentiability properties in tangential direction only the normal derivative $\partial_N u |_{\partial \Omega}$ is of additional interest for the trace theory for $m = 2$. Similar arguments apply to higher-order derivatives for $m > 2$.

Let $1 < p < \infty$ and $\Omega \subset \mathbb R^n$ be a bounded domain with $C^{m, 1}$-boundary. Then there exists a surjective, bounded linear higher-order trace operator

$$T_m\colon W^{m, p}(\Omega) \to \prod_{l = 0}^{m-1} W^{m-l-1/p,p}(\partial \Omega)$$

with Sobolev-Slobodeckij spaces $W^{s, p}(\partial \Omega)$ for non-integer $s > 0$ defined on $\partial \Omega$ through transformation to the planar case $W^{s, p}(\Omega')$ for $\Omega' \subset \mathbb R^{n-1}$, whose definition is elaborated in the article on Sobolev-Slobodeckij spaces. The operator $T_m$ extends the classical normal traces in the sense that

$T_m u = \left(u |_{\partial \Omega}, \partial_N u |_{\partial \Omega}, \ldots, \partial_N^{m-1} u |_{\partial \Omega}\right)$ for all $u \in W^{m, p}(\Omega) \cap C^{m-1}(\bar \Omega).$

Furthermore, there exists a bounded, linear right-inverse of $T_m$, a higher-order trace extension operator

$$E_m\colon \prod_{l = 0}^{m-1} W^{m-l-1/p,p}(\partial \Omega) \to W^{m, p}(\Omega)$$.

Finally, the spaces $W^{m, p}_0(\Omega)$, the completion of $C^\infty_c(\Omega)$ in the $W^{m, p}(\Omega)$-norm, can be characterized as the kernel of $T_m$, i.e.

$$W^{m, p}_0(\Omega) = \{ u \in W^{m, p}(\Omega) \mid T_m u = 0 \}$$.

=== Less regular spaces ===
==== No trace in L^{p} ====
There is no sensible extension of the concept of traces to $L^p(\Omega)$ for $1 \leq p < \infty$ since any bounded linear operator which extends the classical trace must be zero on the space of test functions $C^\infty_c(\Omega)$, which is a dense subset of $L^p(\Omega)$, implying that such an operator would be zero everywhere.

==== Generalized normal trace ====
Let $\operatorname{div} v$ denote the distributional divergence of a vector field $v$. For $1 < p < \infty$ and bounded Lipschitz domain $\Omega \subset \mathbb R^n$ define

$$E_p(\Omega) = \{ v \in (L^p(\Omega))^n \mid \operatorname{div} v \in L^p(\Omega) \}$$

which is a Banach space with norm

$$\| v \|_{E_p(\Omega)} = \left( \| v \|_{L^p(\Omega)}^p + \| \operatorname{div} v \|_{L^p(\Omega)}^p \right)^{1/p}$$.

Let $N$ denote the exterior unit normal field on $\partial \Omega$. Then there exists a bounded linear operator

$$T_N\colon E_p(\Omega) \to (W^{1-1/q, q}(\partial \Omega))'$$,

where $q = p / (p-1)$ is the conjugate exponent to $p$ and $X'$ denotes the continuous dual space to a Banach space $X$, such that $T_N$ extends the normal trace $(v \cdot N) |_{\partial \Omega}$ for $v \in (C^\infty(\bar \Omega))^n$ in the sense that

$$T_N v = \bigl\{ \varphi \in W^{1 - 1/q, q}(\partial \Omega) \mapsto \int_{\partial \Omega} \varphi v \cdot N \,\mathrm{d} S \bigr\}$$.

The value of the normal trace operator $(T_N v)(\varphi)$ for $\varphi \in W^{1-1/q,q}(\partial \Omega)$ is defined by application of the divergence theorem to the vector field $w = E \varphi \, v$ where $E$ is the trace extension operator from above.

Application. Any weak solution $u \in H^1(\Omega)$ to $- \Delta u = f \in L^2(\Omega)$ in a bounded Lipschitz domain $\Omega \subset \mathbb R^n$ has a normal derivative in the sense of $T_N \nabla u \in (W^{1/2,2}(\partial \Omega))^*$. This follows as $\nabla u \in E_2(\Omega)$ since $\nabla u \in L^2(\Omega)$ and $\operatorname{div}(\nabla u) = \Delta u = - f \in L^2(\Omega)$. This result is notable since in Lipschitz domains in general $u \not\in H^2(\Omega)$, such that $\nabla u$ may not lie in the domain of the trace operator $T$.

== Application ==
The theorems presented above allow a closer investigation of the boundary value problem

$$\begin{alignat}{2}
-\Delta u &= f &\quad&\text{in } \Omega,\\
u &= g &&\text{on } \partial \Omega
\end{alignat}$$

on a Lipschitz domain $\Omega \subset \mathbb R^n$ from the motivation. Since only the Hilbert space case $p = 2$ is investigated here, the notation $H^1(\Omega)$ is used to denote $W^{1,2}(\Omega)$ etc. As stated in the motivation, a weak solution $u \in H^1(\Omega)$ to this equation must satisfy $T u = g$ and

$\int_\Omega \nabla u \cdot \nabla \varphi \,\mathrm dx = \int_\Omega f \varphi \,\mathrm dx$ for all $\varphi \in H^1_0(\Omega)$,

where the right-hand side must be interpreted for $f \in H^{-1}(\Omega) = (H^1_0(\Omega))'$ as a duality product with the value $f(\varphi)$.

=== Existence and uniqueness of weak solutions ===
The characterization of the range of $T$ implies that for $T u = g$ to hold the regularity $g \in H^{1/2}(\partial \Omega)$ is necessary. This regularity is also sufficient for the existence of a weak solution, which can be seen as follows. By the trace extension theorem there exists $Eg \in H^1(\Omega)$ such that $T(Eg) = g$. Defining $u_0$ by $u_0 = u - Eg$ we have that $T u_0 = Tu - T(Eg) = 0$ and thus $u_0 \in H^1_0(\Omega)$ by the characterization of $H^1_0(\Omega)$ as space of trace zero. The function $u_0 \in H^1_0(\Omega)$ then satisfies the integral equation

$\int_\Omega \nabla u_0 \cdot \nabla \varphi \,\mathrm dx = \int_\Omega \nabla (u - Eg) \cdot \nabla \varphi \, \mathrm dx = \int_\Omega f \varphi \,\mathrm dx - \int_\Omega \nabla Eg \cdot \nabla \varphi \,\mathrm dx$ for all $\varphi \in H^1_0(\Omega)$.

Thus the problem with inhomogeneous boundary values for $u$ could be reduced to a problem with homogeneous boundary values for $u_0$, a technique which can be applied to any linear differential equation. By the Riesz representation theorem there exists a unique solution $u_0$ to this problem. By uniqueness of the decomposition $u = u_0 + Eg$, this is equivalent to the existence of a unique weak solution $u$ to the inhomogeneous boundary value problem.

=== Continuous dependence on the data ===
It remains to investigate the dependence of $u$ on $f$ and $g$. Let $c_1, c_2, \ldots > 0$ denote constants independent of $f$ and $g$. By continuous dependence of $u_0$ on the right-hand side of its integral equation, there holds

$$\| u_0 \|_{H^1_0(\Omega)} \leq c_1 \left( \|f\|_{H^{-1}(\Omega)} + \|Eg\|_{H^1(\Omega)} \right)$$

and thus, using that $\| u_0 \|_{H^1(\Omega)} \leq c_2 \| u_0 \|_{H^1_0(\Omega)}$ and $\| E g \|_{H^1(\Omega)} \leq c_3 \| g \|_{H^{1/2}(\Omega)}$ by continuity of the trace extension operator, it follows that

$$\begin{align}\| u \|_{H^1(\Omega)} &\leq \| u_0 \|_{H^1(\Omega)} + \| Eg \|_{H^1(\Omega)} \leq c_1 c_2 \|f\|_{H^{-1}(\Omega)} + (c_3+c_1 c_2) \|Eg\|_{H^1(\Omega)} \\
&\leq c_4 \left(\|f\|_{H^{-1}(\Omega)} + \|g\|_{H^{1/2}(\partial \Omega)} \right)\end{align}$$

and the solution map

$$H^{-1}(\Omega) \times H^{1/2}(\partial \Omega) \ni (f, g) \mapsto u \in H^1(\Omega)$$

is therefore continuous.

== See also ==
- Nuclear operators between Banach spaces
