= Strichartz estimate =

In mathematical analysis, Strichartz estimates are a family of inequalities for linear dispersive partial differential equations. These inequalities establish size and decay of solutions in mixed norm Lebesgue spaces. They were first noted by Robert Strichartz and arose out of connections to the Fourier restriction problem.

== Examples ==
Consider the linear Schrödinger equation in $\mathbb{R}^d$ with h = m = 1. Then the solution for initial data $u_0$ is given by $e^{it\Delta/2}u_0$. Let q and r be real numbers satisfying $2\leq q, r \leq \infty$; $\frac{2}{q}+\frac{d}{r}=\frac{d}{2}$; and $(q,r,d)\neq(2,\infty,2)$.

In this case the homogeneous Strichartz estimates take the form:

$$\|e^{it\Delta/2} u_0\|_{L^q_tL^r_x}\leq C_{d,q,r} \|u_0\|_{L^2_x}.$$

Further suppose that $\tilde q, \tilde r$ satisfy the same restrictions as $q, r$ and $\tilde q', \tilde r'$ are their dual exponents, then the dual homogeneous Strichartz estimates take the form:

$$\left\| \int_\mathbb{R} e^{-is\Delta/2}F(s)\,ds\right\|_{L^2_x}\leq C_{d,\tilde q, \tilde r}\|F\|_{L^{\tilde q'}_tL^{\tilde r'}_x}.$$

The inhomogeneous Strichartz estimates are:

$$\left\| \int_{s<t} e^{i(t-s)\Delta/2}F(s)\,ds\right\|_{L^q_tL^r_x}\leq C_{d, q,  r, \tilde q, \tilde r}\|F\|_{L^{\tilde q'}_tL^{\tilde r'}_x}.$$
