= Nikolai Günther =

Russian mathematician (1871–1941)

Nikolai Maximovich Günther
- Николай Максимович Гюнтер
- Born: December 17, 1871; Saint Petersburg, Russian Empire
- Died: May 4, 1941 (aged 69); Leningrad, Soviet Union
- Education: Saint Petersburg University
- Scientific career
- Fields: Integral equations; Potential theory; Partial differential equations
- Workplaces: Saint Petersburg University
- Doctoral advisor: Andrey Markov

Nikolai Maximovich Günther (Russian: Николай Максимович Гюнтер; also transliterated as Nicholas M. Gunther, or N. M. Gjunter; December 17 [O.S. December 5] 1871 – May 4, 1941) was a Russian mathematician known for his work in potential theory and in integral and partial differential equations: later studies have uncovered his contributions to the theory of Gröbner bases.

He was an invited speaker of the ICM in 1924 at Toronto, in 1928 at Bologna, and in 1932 at Zurich.

== Selected publications ==
- Gunther, N. (1932), "Sur les intégrales de Stieltjes et leurs applications aux problèmes de la physique mathématique", Travaux de l'Institute Physico-Mathématique Stekloff (in French), 1: 1–494, JFM 58.1058.01, MR 0031037, Zbl 0006.29703. A large paper aimed at showing the applications of Radon integrals to problems of mathematical physics: the Mathematical Reviews review refers to a 1949 reprint published by the Chelsea Publishing Company.
- Günther, N. M. (1933), "Sur les opérations linéaires", Physikalische Zeitschrift der Sowjetunion, 3: 115–139, JFM 60.1075.03, Zbl 0008.16601.
- Gunther, N. M. (1934), La théorie du potentiel et ses applications aux problèmes fondamentaux de la physique mathématique, Collections de monographies sur la théorie des fonctions (in French) (1st ed.), Paris: Gauthier-Villars, p. 303, JFM 60.1127.04, Zbl 0009.11301, reviewed also by Dixon, A. C. (October 1934), "La Théorie du Potentiel et ses applications aux problèmes de la physique mathématique by N. M. Gunther", The Mathematical Gazette, 18 (230): 278, JSTOR 3605383 and by Longley, W. R. (1936), "Review: La Théorie du Potentiel et ses Applications aux Problèmes Fondamentaux de la Physique Mathématique", Bulletin of the American Mathematical Society, 42 (11): 794, doi:10.1090/S0002-9904-1936-06436-0.
- Günther, N. M. (1967) [1934], Potential theory and its applications to basic problems of mathematical physics, New York: Frederick Ungar Publishing, pp. xi+338, MR 0222316, Zbl 0164.41901. The second edition of the monograph (Gunther 1934), now a classical textbook in potential theory, translated from the Russian original Günther, N. M. (1953) [1934], Теория потенциала и ее применение к основным задачам математической физики (in Russian) (2nd ed.), Москва: Государственное Издательство Технико-Теоретческой Литературы, p. 415, Zbl 0052.10504 (edition cured by V. I. Smirnov and H. L. Smolitskii), which was also translated in German as Günter, N. M. (1957) [1934], Die Potentialtheorie und ihre Anwendung auf Grundaufgaben der mathematischen Physik (in German) (2nd ed.), Leipzig: B. G. Teubner Verlagsgesellschaft, pp. X+314, MR 0109958, Zbl 0077.09702.

== See also ==
- Harmonic function
- Integral equation
- Radon measure
