= Andreas Ehrl =

German water polo player

Personal information
- Nationality: German
- Born: 31 October 1965 (age 59); Berlin, Germany

Sport
- Sport: Water polo

Andreas Ehrl (born 31 October 1965) is a German water polo player. He competed in the men's tournament at the 1988 Summer Olympics.
