= Souček space =

In mathematics, Souček spaces are generalizations of Sobolev spaces, named after the Czech mathematician Jiří Souček. One of their main advantages is that they offer a way to deal with the fact that the Sobolev space W^{1,1} is not a reflexive space; since W^{1,1} is not reflexive, it is not always true that a bounded sequence has a weakly convergent subsequence, which is highly desirable in many applications.

== Definition ==
Let Ω be a bounded domain in n-dimensional Euclidean space with smooth boundary. The Souček space W^{1,μ}(Ω; R^{m}) is defined to be the space of all ordered pairs (u, v), where

- u lies in the Lebesgue space L^{1}(Ω; R^{m});
- v (thought of as the gradient of u) is a regular Borel measure on the closure of Ω;
- there exists a sequence of functions u_{k} in the Sobolev space W^{1,1}(Ω; R^{m}) such that

$$\lim_{k \to \infty} u_{k} = u \mbox{ in } L^{1} (\Omega; \mathbf{R}^{m})$$

and

$$\lim_{k \to \infty} \nabla u_{k} = v$$

weakly-∗ in the space of all R^{m×n}-valued regular Borel measures on the closure of Ω.

== Properties ==
- The Souček space W^{1,μ}(Ω; R^{m}) is a Banach space when equipped with the norm given by

$$\| (u, v) \| := \| u \|_{L^{1}} + \| v \|_{M},$$

i.e. the sum of the L^{1} and total variation norms of the two components.
