= Sobolev inequality =

Theorem about inclusions between Sobolev spaces

In mathematics, especially mathematical analysis, the Sobolev inequalities are a class of inequalities relating norms including those of Sobolev spaces. They are used to prove the Sobolev embedding theorem, which gives inclusions between certain Sobolev spaces, and the Rellich–Kondrachov theorem which gives slightly stronger conditions under which some Sobolev spaces are compactly embedded in others. They are named after Sergei Lvovich Sobolev.

== Sobolev embedding theorem ==
Graphical representation of the embedding conditions. The space W^{3,p}, represented by a blue dot at the point (1/p, 3), embeds into the spaces indicated by red dots, all lying on a line with slope n. The white circle at (0,0) indicates the impossibility of optimal embeddings into L^{∞}.

Let W^{k,p}(R^{n}) denote the Sobolev space consisting of all real-valued functions on R^{n} whose weak derivatives up to order k are functions in L^{p}. Here k is a non-negative integer and 1 ≤ p < ∞. The first part of the Sobolev embedding theorem states that if k > ℓ, p < n and 1 ≤ p < q < ∞ are two real numbers such that

$$\frac{1}{p}-\frac{k}{n} = \frac{1}{q} -\frac{\ell}{n},$$

(given $n$, $p$, $k$ and $\ell$ this is satisfied for some $q \in [1, \infty)$ provided $(k- \ell) p < n$), then

$$W^{k,p}(\mathbf{R}^n)\subseteq W^{\ell,q}(\mathbf{R}^n)$$

and the embedding is continuous: for every $f \in W^{k,p}(\mathbf{R}^n)$, one has $f \in W^{l,q}(\mathbf{R}^n)$, and

$$\biggl(\int_{\mathbf{R}^n} \vert \nabla^\ell f\vert^q \biggr)^\frac{1}{q}
\le C \biggl(\int_{\mathbf{R}^n} \vert \nabla^k f\vert^p \biggr)^\frac{1}{p}.$$

In the special case of k = 1 and ℓ = 0, Sobolev embedding gives

$$W^{1,p}(\mathbf{R}^n) \subseteq L^{p^*}(\mathbf{R}^n)$$

where p^{∗} is the Sobolev conjugate of p, given by

$$\frac{1}{p^*} = \frac{1}{p} - \frac{1}{n}$$

and for every $f \in W^{1,p}(\mathbf{R}^n)$, one has $f \in L^{p^*}(\mathbf{R}^n)$ and

$$\biggl(\int_{\mathbf{R}^n} \vert f\vert^{p^*} \biggr)^{\frac{1}{p^*}}
\le C \biggl(\int_{\mathbf{R}^n} \vert \nabla f\vert^p \biggr)^{\frac{1}{p}}.$$

This special case of the Sobolev embedding is a direct consequence of the Gagliardo–Nirenberg–Sobolev inequality. The result should be interpreted as saying that if a function $f$ in $L^p(\mathbf{R}^n)$ has one derivative in $L^p$, then $f$ itself has improved local behavior, meaning that it belongs to the space $L^{p^*}$ where $p^*>p$. (Note that $1/p^*<1/p$, so that $p^*>p$.) Thus, any local singularities in $f$ must be more mild than for a typical function in $L^p$.

If the line from the picture above intersects the y-axis at s = r + α, the embedding into a Hölder space C^{r, α} (red) holds. White circles indicate intersection points at which optimal embeddings are not valid.

The second part of the Sobolev embedding theorem applies to embeddings in Hölder spaces C^{r,α}(R^{n}). If n < pk and

$$\frac{1}{p}-\frac{k}{n} = -\frac{r + \alpha}{n},  \mbox{ or, equivalently, } r + \alpha = k - \frac{n}{p}$$

with α ∈ (0, 1) then one has the embedding

$$W^{k,p}(\mathbf{R}^n)\subset C^{r,\alpha}(\mathbf{R}^n).$$

In other words, for every $f \in W^{k,p}(\mathbf{R}^n)$ and $x, y \in \mathbf{R}^n$, one has $f \in C^r (\mathbf{R}^n)$, in addition,

$$\vert \nabla^r f (x) - \nabla^r f (y) \vert
\le C \biggl(\int_{\mathbf{R}^n} \vert \nabla^k f \vert^p\biggr)^\frac{1}{p} \vert x - y \vert^\alpha.$$

This part of the Sobolev embedding is a direct consequence of Morrey's inequality. Intuitively, this inclusion expresses the fact that the existence of sufficiently many weak derivatives implies some continuity of the classical derivatives. If $\alpha = 1$ then $W^{k,p}(\mathbf{R}^n)\subset C^{r,\gamma}(\mathbf{R}^n)$ for every $\gamma \in (0,1)$.

In particular, as long as $pk>n$, the embedding criterion will hold with $r=0$ and some positive value of $\alpha$. That is, for a function $f$ on $\mathbb R^n$, if $f$ has $k$ derivatives in $L^p$ and $pk>n$, then $f$ will be continuous (and actually Hölder continuous with some positive exponent $\alpha$).

=== Generalizations ===
The Sobolev embedding theorem holds for Sobolev spaces W^{k,p}(M) on other suitable domains M. In particular (Aubin 1982, Chapter 2; Aubin 1976), both parts of the Sobolev embedding hold when

- M is a bounded open set in R^{n} with Lipschitz boundary (or whose boundary satisfies the cone condition; Adams 1975, Theorem 5.4)
- M is a compact Riemannian manifold
- M is a compact Riemannian manifold with boundary and the boundary is Lipschitz (meaning that the boundary can be locally represented as a graph of a Lipschitz continuous function).
- M is a complete Riemannian manifold with injectivity radius δ > 0 and bounded sectional curvature.

If M is a bounded open set in R^{n} with continuous boundary, then W^{1,2}(M) is compactly embedded in L^{2}(M) (Nečas 2012, Section 1.1.5, Theorem 1.4).

=== Kondrachov embedding theorem ===
On a compact manifold M with C^{1} boundary, the Kondrachov embedding theorem states that if k > ℓ and
$$\frac{1}{p}-\frac{k}{n} < \frac{1}{q} -\frac{\ell}{n}$$
then the Sobolev embedding

$$W^{k,p}(M)\subset W^{\ell,q}(M)$$

is completely continuous (compact). Note that the condition is just as in the first part of the Sobolev embedding theorem, with the equality replaced by an inequality, thus requiring a more regular space W^{k,p}(M).

== Gagliardo–Nirenberg–Sobolev inequality ==
Assume that u is a continuously differentiable real-valued function on R^{n} with compact support. Then for 1 ≤ p < n there is a constant C depending only on n and p such that

$$\|u\|_{L^{p^*}(\mathbf{R}^n)}\leq C \|Du\|_{L^{p}(\mathbf{R}^n)}.$$

with $1/p^* = 1/p - 1/n$. The case $1< p < n$ is due to Sobolev and the case $p =1$ to Gagliardo and Nirenberg independently. The Gagliardo–Nirenberg–Sobolev inequality implies directly the Sobolev embedding

$$W^{1,p}(\mathbf{R}^n) \sub L^{p^*}(\mathbf{R}^n).$$

The embeddings in other orders on R^{n} are then obtained by suitable iteration.

== Hardy–Littlewood–Sobolev lemma ==
Sobolev's original proof of the Sobolev embedding theorem relied on the following, sometimes known as the Hardy–Littlewood–Sobolev fractional integration theorem. An equivalent statement is known as the Sobolev lemma in (Aubin 1982, Chapter 2). A proof is in (Stein 1970, Chapter V, §1.3).

Let 0 < α < n and 1 < p < q < ∞. Let I_{α} = (−Δ)^{−α/2} be the Riesz potential on R^{n}. Then, for q defined by

$$\frac 1 q = \frac 1 p - \frac \alpha n$$

there exists a constant C depending only on p such that

$$\left \|I_\alpha f \right \|_q \le C \|f\|_p.$$

If p = 1, then one has two possible replacement estimates. The first is the more classical weak-type estimate:

$$m \left \{x : \left |I_\alpha f(x) \right | > \lambda \right \} \le C \left( \frac{\|f\|_1}{\lambda} \right )^q,$$

where 1/q = 1 − α/n. Alternatively one has the estimate for dimension n≥2
$$\left \|I_\alpha f \right \|_q \le C \|Rf\|_1,$$
where $Rf$ is the vector-valued Riesz transform, cf. (Schikorra, Spector & Van Schaftingen 2017). The boundedness of the Riesz transforms implies that the latter inequality gives a unified way to write the family of inequalities for the Riesz potential.

The Hardy–Littlewood–Sobolev lemma implies the Sobolev embedding essentially by the relationship between the Riesz transforms and the Riesz potentials.

== Morrey's inequality ==
Assume n < p ≤ ∞. Then there exists a constant C, depending only on p and n, such that

$$\|u\|_{C^{0,\gamma}(\mathbf{R}^n)}\leq C \|u\|_{W^{1,p}(\mathbf{R}^n)}$$

for all u ∈ C^{1}(R^{n}) ∩ L^{p}(R^{n}), where

$$\gamma=1-\frac{n}{p}.$$

Thus if u ∈ W^{1,p}(R^{n}), then u is in fact Hölder continuous of exponent γ, after possibly being redefined on a set of measure 0.

A similar result holds in a bounded domain U with Lipschitz boundary. In this case,

$$\|u\|_{C^{0,\gamma}(U)}\leq C \|u\|_{W^{1,p}(U)}$$

where the constant C depends now on n, p and U. This version of the inequality follows from the previous one by applying the norm-preserving extension of W^{1,p}(U) to W^{1,p}(R^{n}). The inequality is named after Charles B. Morrey Jr.

== General Sobolev inequalities ==
Let U be a bounded open subset of R^{n}, with a C^{1} boundary. (U may also be unbounded, but in this case its boundary, if it exists, must be sufficiently well-behaved.)

Assume u ∈ W^{k,p}(U). Then we consider two cases:

=== k < n/p or k = n, p = 1 ===
In this case we conclude that u ∈ L^{q}(U), where

$$\frac{1}{q}=\frac{1}{p}-\frac{k}{n}.$$

We have in addition the estimate

$$\|u\|_{L^q(U)}\leq C \|u\|_{W^{k,p}(U)}$$,

the constant C depending only on k, p, n, and U.

=== k > n/p ===
Here, we conclude that u belongs to a Hölder space, more precisely:

$$u \in C^{k-\left[\frac{n}{p}\right]-1,\gamma}(U),$$

where

$$\gamma = \begin{cases}
\left[\frac{n}{p}\right]+1-\frac{n}{p} & \frac{n}{p} \notin \mathbf{Z} \\
\text{any element in } (0, 1) & \frac{n}{p} \in \mathbf{Z}
\end{cases}$$

We have in addition the estimate

$$\|u\|_{C^{k-\left[\frac{n}{p}\right]-1,\gamma}(U)}\leq C \|u\|_{W^{k,p}(U)},$$

the constant C depending only on k, p, n, γ, and U. In particular, the condition $k>n/p$ guarantees that $u$ is continuous (and actually Hölder continuous with some positive exponent).

== Case p=n, k=1 ==
If $u\in W^{1,n}(\mathbf{R}^n)$, then u is a function of bounded mean oscillation and

$$|u|_{\operatorname{BMO}(\mathbf R^n)} \leq C \|Du\|_{L^n(\mathbf{R}^n)},$$

for some constant C depending only on n. This estimate is a corollary of the Poincaré inequality. (It should as well be stressed that on the left hand side is the BMO seminorm.)

== Case kp=n ==
The prior result may be extended to arbitrary degree $k$. For $k\geq 2$, if $kp=n$, then for every $u\in W^{k,n/k}(\mathbf R^n)$ there exists a polynomial $P$ of degree $k-1$ such that

$$\Vert u-P\circ u\Vert_{\operatorname{BMO}(\mathbf R^n)}\leq C\Vert D^k u\Vert_{L^{n/k}(\mathbf R^n)}$$

additionally, for any $j=1,\dots,k-1$, we have

$$\Vert D^j(u-P\circ u)\Vert_{L^{n/j}(\mathbf R^n)}\leq C \Vert D^k u\Vert_{L^{n/k}(\mathbf R^n)}$$

In particular this implies the inclusion embedding

$$W^{k,n/k}(\mathbf R^n) \hookrightarrow \operatorname{BMO}(\mathbf R^n)\cap W^{1,q_1}(\mathbf R^n)\cap \dots\cap W^{k-1,q_{k-1}}(\mathbf R^n)$$

for all exponents $q_j$ satisfying $n/k\leq q_j\leq n/j$, $j=1,\dots,k-1$.

== Nash inequality ==
The Nash inequality, introduced by John Nash (1958), states that there exists a constant C > 0, such that for all u ∈ L^{1}(R^{n}) ∩ W^{1,2}(R^{n}),

$$\|u\|_{L^2(\mathbf{R}^n)}^{1+2/n} \leq C\|u\|_{L^1(\mathbf{R}^n)}^{2/n} \| Du\|_{L^2(\mathbf{R}^n)}.$$

The inequality follows from basic properties of the Fourier transform. Indeed, integrating over the complement of the ball of radius ρ,

$\int_{|x|\ge\rho} \left |\hat{u}(x) \right |^2\,dx \le \int_{|x|\ge\rho} \frac{|x|^2}{\rho^2} \left |\hat{u}(x) \right |^2\,dx\le \rho^{-2}\int_{\mathbf{R}^n}|D u|^2\,dx$	1

because $1\le|x|^2/\rho^2$. On the other hand, one has

$$|\hat{u}| \le \|u\|_{L^1}$$

which, when integrated over the ball of radius ρ gives

$\int_{|x|\le\rho} |\hat{u}(x)|^2\,dx \le \rho^n\omega_n \|u\|_{L^1}^2$	2

where ω_{n} is the volume of the n-ball. Choosing ρ to minimize the sum of (1) and (2) and applying Parseval's theorem:

$$\|\hat{u}\|_{L^2} = \|u\|_{L^2}$$

gives the inequality.

In the special case of n = 1, the Nash inequality can be extended to the L^{p} case, in which case it is a generalization of the Gagliardo-Nirenberg-Sobolev inequality (Brezis 2011, Comments on Chapter 8). In fact, if I is a bounded interval, then for all 1 ≤ r < ∞ and all 1 ≤ q ≤ p < ∞ the following inequality holds

$$\| u\|_{L^p(I)}\le C\| u\|^{1-a}_{L^q(I)} \|u\|^a_{W^{1,r}(I)},$$

where:

$$a\left(\frac{1}{q}-\frac{1}{r}+1\right)=\frac{1}{q}-\frac{1}{p}.$$

== Logarithmic Sobolev inequality ==
The simplest of the Sobolev embedding theorems, described above, states that if a function $f$ in $L^p(\mathbb R^n)$ has one derivative in $L^p$, then $f$ itself is in $L^{p^*}$, where

$$1/p^*=1/p-1/n.$$

We can see that as $n$ tends to infinity, $p^*$ approaches $p$. Thus, if the dimension $n$ of the space on which $f$ is defined is large, the improvement in the local behavior of $f$ from having a derivative in $L^p$ is small ($p^*$ is only slightly larger than $p$). In particular, for functions on an infinite-dimensional space, we cannot expect any direct analog of the classical Sobolev embedding theorems.

There is, however, a type of Sobolev inequality, established by Leonard Gross (Gross 1975) and known as a logarithmic Sobolev inequality, that has dimension-independent constants and therefore continues to hold in the infinite-dimensional setting. The logarithmic Sobolev inequality says, roughly, that if a function is in $L^p$ with respect to a Gaussian measure and has one derivative that is also in $L^p$, then $f$ is in "$L^p$-log", meaning that the integral of $|f|^p\log|f|$ is finite. The inequality expressing this fact has constants that do not involve the dimension of the space and, thus, the inequality holds in the setting of a Gaussian measure on an infinite-dimensional space. It is now known that logarithmic Sobolev inequalities hold for many different types of measures, not just Gaussian measures.

Although it might seem as if the $L^p$-log condition is a very small improvement over being in $L^p$, this improvement is sufficient to derive an important result, namely hypercontractivity for the associated Dirichlet form operator. This result means that if a function is in the range of the exponential of the Dirichlet form operator—which means that the function has, in some sense, infinitely many derivatives in $L^p$—then the function does belong to $L^{p^*}$ for some $p^*>p$ (Gross 1975 Theorem 6).
