= Continuous embedding =

In mathematics, one normed vector space is said to be continuously embedded in another normed vector space if the inclusion function between them is continuous. In some sense, the two norms are "almost equivalent", even though they are not both defined on the same space. Several of the Sobolev embedding theorems are continuous embedding theorems.

== Definition ==
Let X and Y be two normed vector spaces, with norms ||·||_{X} and ||·||_{Y} respectively, such that X ⊆ Y. If the inclusion map (identity function)

$$i : X \hookrightarrow Y : x \mapsto x$$

is continuous, i.e. if there exists a constant C > 0 such that

$$\| x \|_Y \leq C \| x \|_X$$

for every x in X, then X is said to be continuously embedded in Y. Some authors use the hooked arrow "↪" to denote a continuous embedding, i.e. "X ↪ Y" means "X and Y are normed spaces with X continuously embedded in Y". This is a consistent use of notation from the point of view of the category of topological vector spaces, in which the morphisms ("arrows") are the continuous linear maps.

== Examples ==
- A finite-dimensional example of a continuous embedding is given by a natural embedding of the real line X = R into the plane Y = R^{2}, where both spaces are given the Euclidean norm:

$$i : \mathbf{R} \to \mathbf{R}^2 : x \mapsto (x, 0)$$

In this case, ||x||_{X} = ||x||_{Y} for every real number X. Clearly, the optimal choice of constant C is C = 1.

- An infinite-dimensional example of a continuous embedding is given by the Rellich–Kondrachov theorem: let Ω ⊆ R^{n} be an open, bounded, Lipschitz domain, and let 1 ≤ p < n. Set

$$p^{*} = \frac{n p}{n - p}.$$

Then the Sobolev space W^{1,p}(Ω; R) is continuously embedded in the L^{p} space L^{p^{∗}}(Ω; R). In fact, for 1 ≤ q < p^{∗}, this embedding is compact. The optimal constant C will depend upon the geometry of the domain Ω.

- Infinite-dimensional spaces also offer examples of discontinuous embeddings. For example, consider

$$X = Y = C^0 ([0, 1]; \mathbf{R}),$$

the space of continuous real-valued functions defined on the unit interval, but equip X with the L^{1} norm and Y with the supremum norm. For n ∈ N, let f_{n} be the continuous, piecewise linear function given by

$$f_n (x) = \begin{cases} - n^2 x + n , & 0 \leq x \leq \tfrac 1 n; \\ 0, & \text{otherwise.} \end{cases}$$

Then, for every n, ||f_{n}||_{Y} = ||f_{n}||_{∞} = n, but

$$\| f_n \|_{L^1} = \int_0^1 | f_n (x) | \, \mathrm{d} x = \frac1{2}.$$

Hence, no constant C can be found such that ||f_{n}||_{Y} ≤ C||f_{n}||_{X}, and so the embedding of X into Y is discontinuous.

== See also ==
- Compact embedding
