= Triebel–Lizorkin space =

In the mathematical discipline known as functional analysis, a Triebel–Lizorkin space is a generalization of many standard function spaces such as L^{p} spaces and Sobolev spaces. It is named after Hans Triebel (born February 7th 1936 in Dessau) and Petr Ivanovich Lizorkin.
