= Lipschitz domain =

Domain in a Euclidean space whose boundary is sufficiently regular

In mathematics, a Lipschitz domain (or domain with Lipschitz boundary) is a domain in Euclidean space whose boundary is "sufficiently regular" in the sense that it can be thought of as locally being the graph of a Lipschitz continuous function. The term is named after the German mathematician Rudolf Lipschitz.

== Definition ==
Let $n \in \mathbb N$. Let $\Omega$ be a domain of $\mathbb R^n$ and let $\partial\Omega$ denote the boundary of $\Omega$. Then $\Omega$ is called a Lipschitz domain if for every point $p \in \partial\Omega$ there exists a hyperplane $H$ of dimension $n-1$ through $p$, a Lipschitz-continuous function $g : H \rightarrow \mathbb R$ over that hyperplane, and reals $r > 0$ and $h > 0$ such that

- $\Omega \cap C = \left\{x + y \vec{n} \mid x \in B_r(p) \cap H,\ -h < y < g(x) \right\}$
- $(\partial\Omega) \cap C = \left\{x + y \vec{n} \mid x \in B_r(p) \cap H,\ g(x) = y \right\}$

where

$\vec{n}$ is one of the two unit vectors that are normal to $H,$
$B_{r} (p) := \{x \in \mathbb{R}^{n} \mid \| x - p \| < r \}$ is the open ball of radius $r$,
$$C := \left\{x + y \vec{n} \mid x \in B_r(p) \cap H,\ {-h} < y < h \right\}.$$

In other words, at each point of its boundary, $\Omega$ is locally the set of points located above the graph of some Lipschitz function.

== Generalization ==
A more general notion is that of weakly Lipschitz domains, which are domains whose boundary is locally flattenable by a bilipschitz mapping. Lipschitz domains in the sense above are sometimes called strongly Lipschitz by contrast with weakly Lipschitz domains.

A domain $\Omega$ is weakly Lipschitz if for every point $p \in \partial\Omega,$ there exists a radius $r > 0$ and a map $\ell_p : B_r(p) \rightarrow Q$ such that

- $\ell_p$ is a bijection;
- $\ell_p$ and $\ell_p^{-1}$ are both Lipschitz continuous functions;
- $\ell_p\left( \partial\Omega \cap B_r(p) \right) = Q_0;$
- $\ell_p\left( \Omega \cap B_r(p) \right) = Q_+;$

where $Q$ denotes the unit ball $B_1(0)$ in $\mathbb{R}^n$ and

$$Q_{0} := \{(x_1, \ldots, x_n) \in Q \mid x_n = 0 \};$$
$$Q_{+} := \{(x_1, \ldots, x_n) \in Q \mid x_n > 0 \}.$$

A (strongly) Lipschitz domain is always a weakly Lipschitz domain but the converse is not true. An example of weakly Lipschitz domains that fails to be a strongly Lipschitz domain is given by the crossed-bricks domain.

== Applications of Lipschitz domains ==
Many of the Sobolev embedding theorems require that the domain of study be a Lipschitz domain. Consequently, many partial differential equations and variational problems are defined on Lipschitz domains.
