= Compact embedding =

Feature of certain mathematical spaces

In mathematics, the notion of being compactly embedded expresses the idea that one set or space is "well contained" inside another. There are versions of this concept appropriate to general topology and functional analysis. The notation for "$X$ is compactly embedded in $Y$" is $X \subset\subset Y$, or $X \Subset Y$.

When used in functional analysis, compact embedding is usually about Banach spaces of functions.

Several of the Sobolev embedding theorems are compact embedding theorems.

When an embedding is not compact, it may possess a related, but weaker, property of cocompactness.

== Definition ==
=== Topological spaces ===
Let $X$ be a topological space, and let $V$ and $W$ be subsets of $X$. We say that $V$ is compactly embedded in $W$ if

- $V \subseteq \operatorname{Cl}(V) \subseteq \operatorname{Int}(W)$, where $\operatorname{Cl}(V)$ denotes the closure of $V$, and $\operatorname{Int}(W)$ denotes the interior of $W$; and
- $\operatorname{Cl}(V)$ is compact.

For Hausdorff spaces, this is equivalent to there existing some compact set $K$ such that $V \subseteq K \subseteq \operatorname{Int}(W)$.

=== Normed spaces ===
Let $X$ and $Y$ be two normed vector spaces with norms $\| \cdot \|_X$ and $\| \cdot \|_Y$ respectively, and suppose that $X \subseteq Y$. We say that $X$ is compactly embedded in $Y$, if

- $X$ is continuously embedded in $Y$; i.e., there is a constant $C$ such that $\|x\|_Y \le C \|x\|_X$ for all $x$ in $X$; and
- The embedding of $X$ into $Y$ is a compact operator: any bounded set in $X$ is totally bounded in $Y$, i.e. every sequence in such a bounded set has a subsequence that is Cauchy in the norm $\| \cdot \|_Y$.

=== Banach spaces ===
If $Y$ is a Banach space, an equivalent definition is that the embedding operator (the identity) $i \colon X \to Y$ is a compact operator.
