= Tatyana Shaposhnikova =

Russian-born Swedish mathematician

- Born: 20 September 1946 (age 79)
- Citizenship: Sweden
- Education: Leningrad University
- Known for: Function spaces, partial differential equations
- Spouse: Vladimir G. Maz'ya
- Awards: Verdaguer Prize (2003); Thureus prize (2010).
- Scientific career
- Fields: Function spaces, history of mathematics, partial differential equations
- Workplaces: Leningrad Military Academy; Leningrad Institute of Refrigeration Industry; Leningrad Finance and Economics Institute; Linköping University; Ohio State University; Royal Institute of Technology
- Doctoral advisor: Solomon G. Mikhlin
- Website: Tatyana Shaposhnikova's academic web site

Tatyana Olegovna Shaposhnikova (Russian: Татьяна Олеговна Шапошникова, born 1946) is a Russian-born Swedish mathematician. She is best known for her work in the theory of multipliers in function spaces, partial differential operators and history of mathematics, some of which was partly done jointly with Vladimir Maz'ya. Moreover, jointly with her spouse, she is the eponymous of the Maz'ya-Shaposhnikova limit formula. She is also a translator of both scientific and literary texts.

== Biography ==
=== Academic career ===
T.O. Shaposhnikova graduated from Leningrad University in 1969. From 1969 to 1972 she was a graduate student at the same university. In 1973 she was awarded the Candidate of Sciences degree. From 1973 to 1990 she worked in the mathematics departments of a number of technical institutes in Leningrad, first as an assistant and then as an associate professor. She lost her job twice because of her contacts with active dissidents, thus having to change her employer. She immigrated in Sweden in 1990 with her family. She has worked as associate professor (universitetslektor) at the Department of Mathematics of the University of Linköping from 1 July 1991 to September 2013, and held a position of full professor at the Department of Mathematics of the Ohio State University, from 2004 to 2008: in 2013-2018 she held a part-time job at the Department of Mathematics at the Royal Institute of Technology.

From 2010 to 2016 she was a member of the European Mathematical Society Ethics Committee. Currently she serves as a member of the editorial boards of the journal Complex variable and Elliptic Equations and of the Eurasian Mathematical Journal.

=== Honors ===
In March 2003 Shaposhnikova and Vladimir Maz'ya were awarded the Verdaguer Prize by the French Academy of Sciences for their work resulting in the first scientific biography of Jacques Hadamard. In May 2010 she was awarded the Thureus prize by the Royal Society of Sciences in Uppsala "for her outstanding contribution to the theory of partial differential equations and in particular to the theory of multipliers in function spaces".

== Work ==
=== Research activity ===
Shaposhnikova is the author of more than 70 research papers and of four books: her research mainly belongs to the following fields.

==== Function spaces ====
From 1979 on, the theory of multipliers in various spaces of differentiable functions has been the main research theme of her work. She found conditions for the boundedness of singular integrals and pseudodifferential operators acting between pairs of Sobolev spaces in 1995. In 1989 she showed that multipliers in Bessel potential spaces are traces of multipliers belonging to a certain class of differentiable functions with a weighted mixed norm. A large part of her joint work with Vladimir Maz'ya on the theory of multipliers involves their analytic characterization, trace inequalities and relations between traces and extension of multipliers, relations of Sobolev multipliers and other function spaces, maximal subalgebras of multiplier spaces, estimates of their essential norm and compactness of multipliers.

==== Linear and non-linear PDEs ====
Based on her researches on the theory of multipliers, T. Shaposhnikova gave various applications of this theory to the study of solutions to second order linear and quasilinear elliptic partial differential equations and systems of such equations: this was a consequence of the fact that, in several cases, such solutions can be considered as multipliers in certain spaces of differentiable functions on a given domain (1986, 1987). She described the structure of composition operators in spaces of multipliers between Sobolev spaces and gave applications of those results to semilinear elliptic systems of equations (1987). She also showed that multipliers can be naturally suited to deal with the L_{p} coercivity of the Neumann problem (1989). Various other applications of multipliers, for example to the problem of higher regularity in single and double layer potential theory for Lipschitz domains, to the problem of regularity at the boundary in the L_{p}-theory of elliptic boundary value problems and to singular integral operators in Sobolev spaces are summarized in the book (Maz'ya & Shaposhnikova 2009).

==== History of mathematics ====
Her prize winning book on Jacques Hadamard, coauthored with V. Maz'ya, was published in 1998 jointly by the American Mathematical Society and the London Mathematical Society. An earlier work on the same subject was written by her jointly with E. Polishchuk (1990). Her recent activity in this field includes the paper (Shaposhnikova 2005) telling three stories of scientists who were forced to answer a mathematical question under rather trying circumstances.

=== Translation and editing activity ===
Shaposhnikova has translated and edited several mathematical monographs: it is worth to note the works by Koshelev et al. (1975) and by Mikhlin (1979), the book on Sobolev spaces by Maz'ya (1985), and the books by Kresin & Maz'ya (2007) and by Maz'ya & Soloviev (2010). However, her work is not restricted only to the translation of monographs: for example she translated into Russian a play by Lars Gårding, titled "Mathematics, Life and Death", published the mathematical journal Algebra i Analiz (Алгебра и анализ).

Shaposhnikova began translating fiction while still living in Russia. In the 1970s she translated into Russian "The Voyage of the Dawn Treader", "The Silver Chair" and the "Screwtape Letters" by C. S. Lewis. These translations were impossible to publish due to ideological reasons and were distributed as samizdat: they first appeared as proper publications only in the mid-1990s, with new reprints appearing regularly.

In 2005 she began translating Swedish children's books into Russian. Among them are "Kerstin and I" by Astrid Lindgren, "Mechanical Santa Claus" by Sven Nordqvist and two books of the "Loranga" series by Barbro Lindgren.

== Selected publications ==
=== Scientific works ===
==== Articles ====
- Maz'ya, V. G.; Shaposhnikova, T. O. (1979), "Traces and extensions of multipliers in the space W^{l}_{p}", Uspekhi Matematicheskikh Nauk (in Russian), 34 (2 (206)): 205–206, MR 0535721, Zbl 0405.46026.
- Shaposhnikova, T. O. (1986), "Bounded solutions of elliptic equations as multipliers in spaces of differentiable functions", Zapiski Nauchnykh Seminarov LOMI (in Russian), 149: 165–176, MR 0849306, Zbl 0601.35023.
- Shaposhnikova, T. O. (1986a), "Multiplicative properties of solutions of elliptic equations", Joint sessions of the Petrovskii Seminar on differential equations and mathematical problems of physics and of the Moscow Mathematical Society (ninth meeting, January 20–23, 1986), Uspekhi Matematicheskikh Nauk (in Russian), vol. 41, p. 209.
- Shaposhnikova, T. O. (1987), "On solvability of quasilinear elliptic equations in spaces of multipliers", Izvestiya Vysshikh Uchebnykh Zavedenii. Matematika (in Russian), 31 (8): 74–81, MR 0917617, Zbl 0701.35041.
- Shaposhnikova, T. O. (1987a), "The superposition operator in classes of multipliers of Sobolev spaces", Seminar Analysis (in Russian), 1986–1987: 181–190, MR 0941610, Zbl 0647.47043.
- Shaposhnikova, T. O. (1987b), "On nonlinear differential operators in spaces of multipliers", Joint sessions of the Petrovskii Seminar on differential equations and mathematical problems of physics and of the Moscow Mathematical Society (tenth meeting, 19–22 January 1987), Uspekhi Matematicheskikh Nauk (in Russian), vol. 42, p. 158.
- Shaposhnikova, T. O. (1988), "On coercivity in L_{p} of the Neumann problem in a domain with nonsmooth boundary", Joint sessions of the Petrovskii Seminar on differential equations and mathematical problems of physics and of the Moscow Mathematical Society (eleventh session, 18–21 January 1988), Uspekhi Matematicheskikh Nauk (in Russian), vol. 42, p. 181.
- Shaposhnikova, T. O. (1989), "Multipliers in Bessel potential spaces as traces of multipliers in weighted classes", Trudy Tbilisskogo Matematicheskogo Instituta (in Russian), 88: 59–63, MR 1031711, Zbl 0711.42016.
- Shaposhnikova, T. O. (1989a), "Traces of multipliers in the space of Bessel potentials", Matematicheskie Zametki (in Russian), 46 (3): 100–109, MR 1032913, Zbl 0694.46028.
- Shaposhnikova, T. O. (1989b), "Applications of multipliers in Sobolev spaces to L_{p}–coercivity of the Neumann problem", Doklady Akademii Nauk SSSR (in Russian), 305 (4): 786–789, MR 0998033, Zbl 0727.35042.
- Shaposhnikova, T. O. (1995), "On Continuity of Singular Integral Operators in Sobolev Spaces", Mathematica Scandinavica, 76: 85–97, doi:10.7146/math.scand.a-12526, MR 1345090, Zbl 0845.35145.
- Maz'ya, Vladimir G.; Shaposhnikova, Tatyana O. (2002), "On the Bourgain, Brezis, and Mironescu theorem concerning limiting embeddings of fractional Sobolev spaces", Journal of Functional Analysis, 195 (2): 230–238, doi:10.1006/jfan.2002.3955, MR 1940355, Zbl 1028.46050.

==== Books ====
- Maz'ya, V. G.; Shaposhnikova, T. O. (1985), Theory of multipliers in spaces of differentiable functions, Monographs and Studies in Mathematics, vol. 23, Boston – London – Melbourne: Pitman Publishing Inc., pp. xiii+344, ISBN 978-0-273-08638-3, MR 0785568, Zbl 0645.46031.
- Maz'ya, Vladimir G.; Shaposhnikova, Tatyana O. (2009) [1985], Theory of Sobolev multipliers. With applications to differential and integral operators, Grundlehren der Mathematischen Wissenschaft, vol. 337, Heidelberg: Springer-Verlag, pp. xiii+609, ISBN 978-3-540-69490-8, MR 2457601, Zbl 1157.46001.

=== Commemorative and historical works ===
==== Articles ====
- Shaposhnikova, Tatyana (September 2005), "Three high-stakes math exams", The Mathematical Intelligencer, 27 (3): 44–46, doi:10.1007/BF02985838, MR 2162991, S2CID 123024048, Zbl 1173.01323.
- Shaposhnikova, Tatyana (2010), "Jacques Hadamard – En universell matematiker och renässansmänniska", Årsbok 2010 (in Swedish), Uppsala: Kungl. Vetenskaps-Societeten i Uppsala, pp. 65–72, ISSN 0348-7849. The "Thuréusföredrag hållet vid prisutdelningsceremonin i Gustavianum" i.e. the Thuréus speech prof. T. Shaposhnikova gave on 31 August 2010 on the occasion of the ceremony for the 2010 prizes awarding by the Royal Society of Sciences in Uppsala. Published in the Society's yearbook, it includes a biography and a description of her research work, which motivated the award: the main theme of the speech though, as the title says (its English translation reads as:-"Jacques Hadamard – A universal mathematician and Renaissance man"), is a biographical sketch of Jacques Hadamard.

==== Books ====
- Maz'ya, Vladimir; Shaposhnikova, Tatyana (1998), Jacques Hadamard, a Universal Mathematician, History of Mathematics, vol. 14, Providence, RI and London: American Mathematical Society and London Mathematical Society, pp. xxv+574, ISBN 978-0-8218-0841-2, MR 1611073, Zbl 0906.01031. There are also two revised and expanded editions: the French translation Maz'ya, Vladimir; Shaposhnikova, Tatyana (January 2005) [1998], Jacques Hadamard, un mathématicien universel, Sciences & Histoire (in French), Paris: EDP Sciences, p. 554, ISBN 978-2-86883-707-3, and the (further revised and expanded) Russian translation Мазья, В. Г.; Шапошникова, Т. О. (2008) [1998], Жак Адамар Легенда Математики (in Russian), Москва: ИздателЬство МЦНМО, p. 528, ISBN 978-5-94057-083-7.
- Polishchuk, E.; Shaposhnikova, T. (1990), Jacques Hadamard. 1865-1963. (Жак Адамар. 1865-1963.), Nauchno-Bibliograficheskaya Literatura (Научно-библиографическая литература) (in Russian), Leningrad: Nauka, p. 255, ISBN 978-5-02-024506-8, Zbl 0718.01030. An earlier biographic work on Jacques Hadamard written by T. Shaposhnikova jointly with E. Polishchuk.

== See also ==
- Function space
- Multiplier (operator theory)
- Partial differential equation
- Potential theory
- Sobolev space
