= Vladimir Mazya =

Swedish Mathematician

Vladimir Maz'ya
- Born: 31 December 1937 (age 88); Leningrad, Russian SFSR
- Citizenship: Sweden
- Education: Leningrad University
- Known for: Approximate approximations; Asymptotic analysis; Partial differential equations; Sobolev spaces; Theory of ship waves
- Spouse: Tatyana O. Shaposhnikova
- Awards: Humboldt Prize (1999); Verdaguer Prize (2003); Celsius Gold Medal (2004); Senior Whitehead Prize (2009)
- Scientific career
- Workplaces: Leningrad University; Linköping University; Ohio State University; University of Liverpool
- Website: Vladimir Maz'ya academic web site

Vladimir Gilelevich Maz'ya (Russian: Владимир Гилелевич Мазья; born 31 December 1937) (the family name is sometimes transliterated as Mazya, Maz'ja or Mazja) is a Russian-born Swedish mathematician, hailed as "one of the most distinguished analysts of our time" and as "an outstanding mathematician of worldwide reputation", who strongly influenced the development of mathematical analysis and the theory of partial differential equations.

Mazya's early achievements include: his work on Sobolev spaces, in particular the discovery of the equivalence between Sobolev and isoperimetric/isocapacitary inequalities (1960), his counterexamples related to Hilbert's 19th and Hilbert's 20th problem (1968), his solution, together with Yuri Burago, of a problem in harmonic potential theory (1967) posed by Riesz & Szőkefalvi-Nagy (1955, chapter V, § 91), his extension of the Wiener regularity test to p–Laplacian and the proof of its sufficiency for the boundary regularity. Maz'ya solved Vladimir Arnol'd's problem for the oblique derivative boundary value problem (1970) and Fritz John's problem on the oscillations of a fluid in the presence of an immersed body (1977).

In recent years, he proved a Wiener's type criterion for higher order elliptic equations, together with Mikhail Shubin solved a problem in the spectral theory of the Schrödinger operator formulated by Israel Gelfand in 1953, found necessary and sufficient conditions for the validity of maximum principles for elliptic and parabolic systems of PDEs and introduced the so–called approximate approximations. He also contributed to the development of the theory of capacities, nonlinear potential theory, the asymptotic and qualitative theory of arbitrary order elliptic equations, the theory of ill-posed problems, the theory of boundary value problems in domains with piecewise smooth boundary.

== Biography ==
=== Life and academic career ===
Vladimir Maz'ya was born on 31 December 1937 in a Jewish family. His father died in December 1941 at the World War II front, and all four grandparents died during the siege of Leningrad. His mother, a state accountant, chose to not remarry and dedicated her life to him: they lived on her meager salary in a 9 square meters room in a big communal apartment, shared with other four families. As a secondary school student, he repeatedly won the city's mathematics and physics olympiads and graduated with a gold medal.

In 1955, at the age of 18, Maz'ya entered the Mathematics and Mechanics Department of Leningrad University. Taking part to the traditional mathematical olympiad of the faculty, he solved the problems for both first year and second year students and, since he did not make this a secret, the other participants did not submit their solutions causing the invalidation of the contest by the jury which therefore did not award the prize. However, he attracted the attention of Solomon Mikhlin who invited him at his home, thus starting their lifelong friendship: and this friendship had a great influence on him, helping him develop his mathematical style more than anyone else. According to Gohberg (1999, p. 2), in the years to come, "Maz'ya was never a formal student of Mikhlin, but Mikhlin was more than a teacher for him. Maz'ya had found the topics of his dissertations by himself, while Mikhlin taught him mathematical ethics and rules of writing, referring and reviewing".

More details on the life of Vladimir Maz'ya, from his birth to the year 1968, can be found in his autobiography (Maz'ya 2014).

Maz'ya graduated from Leningrad University in 1960. The same year he gave two talks at Smirnov's seminar: their contents were published as a short report in the Proceedings of the USSR Academy of Sciences and later evolved in his "Candidate of Sciences" thesis, "Classes of sets and embedding theorems for function spaces", which was defended in 1962. In 1965 he earned the Doctor of Sciences degree, again from Leningrad University, defending the dissertation "Dirichlet and Neumann problems in Domains with irregular boundaries", when he was only 27. Neither the first nor his second thesis were written under the guidance of an advisor: Vladimir Maz'ya never had a formal scientific adviser, choosing the research problems he worked to by himself.

From 1960 up to 1986, he worked as a "research fellow" at the Research Institute of Mathematics and Mechanics of Leningrad University (RIMM), being promoted from junior to senior research fellow in 1965. From 1968 to 1978 he taught at the Leningrad Shipbuilding Institute, where he was awarded the title of "professor" in 1976. From 1986 to 1990 he worked to the Leningrad Section of the Blagonravov Research Institute of Mechanical Engineering of the USSR Academy of Sciences, where he created and directed the Laboratory of Mathematical Models in Mechanics and the Consulting Center in Mathematics for Engineers.

In 1978 he married Tatyana Shaposhnikova, a former doctoral student of Solomon Mikhlin, and they have a son, Michael: In 1990, they left the URSS for Sweden, where Prof. Maz'ya obtained the Swedish citizenship and started to work at Linköping University.

Currently, he is honorary Senior Fellow of Liverpool University and Professor Emeritus at Linköping University: he is also member of the editorial board of several mathematical journals.

=== Honors ===
In 1962 Maz'ya was awarded the "Young Mathematician" prize by the Leningrad Mathematical Society, for his results on Sobolev spaces: he was the first winner of the prize. In 1990 he was awarded an honorary doctorate from Rostock University. In 1999, Maz'ya received the Humboldt Prize. He was elected member of the Royal Society of Edinburgh in 2000, and of the Swedish Academy of Science in 2002. In March 2003, he, jointly with Tatyana Shaposhnikova, was awarded the Verdaguer Prize by the French Academy of Sciences. On 31 August 2004 he was awarded the Celsius Gold Medal, the Royal Society of Sciences in Uppsala's top award, "for his outstanding research on partial differential equations and hydrodynamics". He was awarded the Senior Whitehead Prize by the London Mathematical Society on 20 November 2009. In 2012 he was elected fellow of the American Mathematical Society. On 30 October 2013 he was elected foreign member of the Georgian National Academy of Sciences.

Starting from 1993, several conferences have been held to honor him: the first one, held in that year at the University of Kyoto, was a conference on Sobolev spaces. On the occasion of his 60th birthday in 1998, two international conferences were held in his honor: the one at the University of Rostock was on Sobolev spaces, while the other, at the École Polytechnique in Paris, was on the boundary element method. He was invited speaker at the International Mathematical Congress held in Beijing in 2002: his talk is an exposition on his work on Wiener–type criteria for higher order elliptic equations. Other two conferences were held on the occasion of his 70th birthday: "Analysis, PDEs and Applications on the occasion of the 70th birthday of Vladimir Maz'ya" was held in Rome, while the "Nordic – Russian Symposium in honour of Vladimir Maz'ya on the occasion of his 70th birthday" was held in Stockholm. On the same occasion, also a volume of the Proceedings of Symposia in Pure Mathematics was dedicated to him. On the occasion of his 80th birthday, a "Workshop on Sobolev Spaces and Partial Differential Equations" was held on 17–18 May 2018 was held at the Accademia Nazionale dei Lincei to honor him. On the 26–31 May 2019, the international conference "Harmonic Analysis and PDE" was held in his honor at the Holon Institute of Technology.

== Work ==
=== Research activity ===
Because of Maz'ya's ability to give complete solutions to problems which are generally considered as unsolvable, Fichera once compared Maz'ya with Santa Rita, the 14th century Italian nun who is the Patron Saint of Impossible Causes.

— Alberto Cialdea, Flavia Lanzara and Paolo Emilio Ricci, (Cialdea, Lanzara & Ricci 2009, p. xii).

Maz'ya authored/coauthored more than 500 publications, including 20 research monographs. Several survey articles describing his work can be found in the book (Rossmann, Takáč & Wildenhain 1999a), and also the paper by Dorina and Marius Mitrea (2008) describes extensively his research achievements, so these references are the main ones in this section: in particular, the classification of the research work of Vladimir Maz'ya is the one proposed by the authors of these two references. He is also the author of Seventy (Five) Thousand Unsolved Problems in Analysis and Partial Differential Equations which collects problems he considers to be important research directions in the field

==== Theory of boundary value problems in nonsmooth domains ====
In one of his early papers, Maz'ya (1961) considers the Dirichlet problem for the following linear elliptic equation:

(1) $\mathcal{L} u = \nabla(A(x)\nabla)u+\mathbf{b}(x)\nabla u + c(x)u=f\qquad x\in\Omega\subset\mathbf{R}^n$

where

- Ω is a bounded region in the n–dimensional euclidean space
- A(x) is a matrix whose first eigenvalue is not less than a fixed positive constant κ > 0 and whose entries are functions sufficiently smooth defined on Ω̅, the closure of Ω.
- b(x), c(x) and f(x) are respectively a vector-valued function and two scalar functions sufficiently smooth on Ω̅ as their matrix counterpart A(x).

He proves the following a priori estimate

(2) $\Vert u \Vert_{L_s(\Omega)} \leq K \left[ \Vert f \Vert_{L_r(\Omega)} + \Vert u \Vert_{L(\Omega)} \right]$

for the weak solution u of equation 1, where K is a constant depending on n, s, r κ and other parameters but not depending on the moduli of continuity of the coefficients. The integrability exponents of the L_{p} norms in Estimate 2 are subject to the relations

1. 1/s ≥ 1/r - 2/n for n/2 > r > 1,
2. s is an arbitrary positive number for r = n/2,

the first one of which answers positively to a conjecture proposed by Guido Stampacchia (1958, p. 237).

== Selected works ==
=== Papers ===
- Maz'ya, Vladimir G. (1960), Классы областей и теоремы вложения функциональных пространств, Доклады Академии Наук СССР (in Russian), vol. 133, pp. 527–530, MR 0126152, Zbl 0114.31001, translated as Maz'ya, Vladimir G. (1960), "Classes of domains and imbedding theorems for function spaces", Soviet Mathematics - Doklady, vol. 1, pp. 882–885, MR 0126152, Zbl 0114.31001.
- Maz'ya, Vladimir G. (1961), Некторые оценки решений эллиптических уравнений второго порядка, Доклады Академии Наук СССР (in Russian), vol. 137, pp. 1057–1059, Zbl 0115.08701, translated as Maz'ya, Vladimir G. (1961), "Some estimates for solutions of elliptic second-order equations", Soviet Mathematics - Doklady, vol. 2, pp. 413–415, Zbl 0115.08701.
- Maz'ya, Vladimir G. (1968), Примеры нерегулярных решений квазилинейных эллиптических уравнений с аналитическими коэффициентами, Функциональный анализ и его приложения (in Russian), vol. 2, no. 3, pp. 53–57, MR 2020860, Zbl 0179.43601, translated in English as Maz'ya, Vladimir G. (1968), "Examples of nonregular solutions of quasilinear elliptic equations with analytic coefficients", Functional Analysis and Its Applications, 2 (3): 230–234, doi:10.1007/BF01076124, MR 2020860, S2CID 121038871, Zbl 0179.43601.
- Maz'ya, V. G. (1969), "О слабых решениях задач Дирихле и Неймана", Труды Московского математического общества (in Russian), vol. 20, pp. 137–172, MR 0259329, Zbl 0179.43302, translated in English as Maz'ya, Vladimir G. (1971) [1969], "On weak solutions of the Dirichlet and Neumann problems", Transactions of the Moscow Mathematical Society, vol. 20, pp. 135–172, MR 0259329, Zbl 0226.35027.
- Maz'ya, Vladimir; Shubin, Mikhail (2005), "Discreteness of spectrum and positivity criteria for Schrödinger operators", Annals of Mathematics, 162 (2): 919–942, arXiv:math/0305278, doi:10.4007/annals.2005.162.919, JSTOR 20159932, MR 2183285, S2CID 14741680, Zbl 1106.35043

=== Books ===
- Burago, Yuri D.; Maz'ya, Vladimir G. (1967), "Некоторые вопросы теории потенциала и теории функций для областей с нерегулярными границами" [Certain questions of potential theory and function theory for regions with irregular boundaries], Записки научных семинаров ЛОМИ (in Russian), vol. 3, pp. 3–152, MR 0227447, Zbl 0172.14903, translated in English as Burago, Yuri D.; Maz'ya, Vladimir G. (1969), Potential Theory and Function Theory on Irregular Regions, Seminars in Mathematics, V. A. Steklov Mathematical Institute, Leningrad, vol. 3, New York: Consultants Bureau, pp. vii+68, ISBN 9780608100449.
- Gelman, I. W; Mazja, W. G. (1981), Abschätzungen für Differentialoperatoren im Halbraum [Estimates for differential operators in the half space], Mathematische Lehrbücher und Monogaphien, II. Albeitung: Mathematische Monographien (in German), vol. 54, Berlin: Akademie-Verlag, p. 221, ISBN 978-3-7643-1275-6, MR 0644480, Zbl 0499.47028. A definitive monograph, giving a detailed study of a priori estimates of constant coefficient matrix differential operators defined on ℝ^{n}×(0,+∞], with n ≥ 1: translated as Gelman, Igor W; Maz'ya, Vladimir G. (2019) [1981], Estimates for differential operators in half-space, EMS Tracts in Mathematics, vol. 31, translated by Apushkinskaya, Darya, Zurich: European Mathematical Society, pp. xvi+246, doi:10.4171/191, ISBN 978-3-03719-191-0, MR 3889979, S2CID 127027104, Zbl 1447.47007.
- Maz'ja, Vladimir G. (1985), Sobolev Spaces, Springer Series in Soviet Mathematics, Berlin–Heidelberg–New York: Springer-Verlag, pp. xix+486, doi:10.1007/978-3-662-09922-3, ISBN 978-3-540-13589-0, MR 0817985, Zbl 0692.46023 (also available with ISBN 0-387-13589-8).
- Maz'ya, Vladimir G.; Shaposhnikova, Tatyana O. (1985), Theory of Multipliers in Spaces of Differentiable Functions, Monographs and Studies in Mathematics, Boston – London – Melbourne: Pitman, ISBN 978-0-273-08638-3, MR 0785568, Zbl 0645.46031.
  - Maz'Ya, V. G.; Shaposhnikova, T. O. (1983). "Theory of multipliers in spaces of differentiable functions". Russian Mathematical Surveys. 38 (3): 23–95. doi:10.1070/RM1983v038n03ABEH003484. S2CID 250849739.
- Maz'ya, Vladimir G. (1991), "Boundary Integral Equations", in Maz'ya, Vladimir G.; Nikol'skiǐ, S. M. (eds.), Analysis IV, Encyclopaedia of Mathematical Sciences, vol. 27, Berlin–Heidelberg–New York: Springer-Verlag, pp. 127–222, doi:10.1007/978-3-642-58175-5_2, ISBN 978-0-387-51997-5, MR 1098507, Zbl 0780.45002 (also available as ISBN 3-540-51997-1).
- Maz'ya, Vladimir G.; Poborchi, Sergei V. (1997), Differentiable Functions on Bad Domains, Singapore–New Jersey–London–Hong Kong: World Scientific, pp. xx+481, ISBN 978-981-02-2767-8, MR 1643072, Zbl 0918.46033.
- Kozlov, Vladimir A.; Maz'ya, Vladimir G.; Rossmann, J. (1997), Elliptic Boundary Value Problems in Domains with Point Singularities, Mathematical Surveys and Monographs, vol. 52, Providence, RI: American Mathematical Society, pp. x+414, ISBN 978-0-8218-0754-5, MR 1469972, Zbl 0947.35004.
- Maz'ya, Vladimir; Shaposhnikova, Tatyana (1998), Jacques Hadamard, a Universal Mathematician, History of Mathematics, vol. 14, Providence, RI and London: American Mathematical Society and London Mathematical Society, pp. xxv+574, ISBN 978-0-8218-0841-2, MR 1611073, Zbl 0906.01031. There are also two revised and expanded editions: the French translation Maz'ya, Vladimir; Shaposhnikova, Tatyana (January 2005) [1998], Jacques Hadamard, un mathématicien universel, Sciences & Histoire (in French), Paris: EDP Sciences, p. 554, ISBN 978-2-86883-707-3, and the (further revised and expanded) Russian translation Мазья, В. Г.; Шапошникова, Т. О. (2008) [1998], Жак Адамар—легенда математики Жак Адамар Легенда Математики (in Russian), Москва: ИздателЬство МЦНМО, p. 528, ISBN 978-5-94057-083-7.
- Kozlov, Vladimir; Maz'ya, Vladimir (1999), Differential Equations with Operator Coefficients, Springer Monographs in Mathematics, Berlin–Heidelberg–New York: Springer-Verlag, pp. XV+442, doi:10.1007/978-3-662-11555-8, ISBN 978-3-540-65119-2, MR 1729870, Zbl 0920.35003.
- Kozlov, Vladimir A.; Maz'ya, Vladimir G.; Movchan, A. B. (1999), Asymptotic Analysis of Fields in Multi-Structures, Oxford Mathematical Monographs, Oxford: Oxford University Press, pp. xvi+282, ISBN 978-0-19-851495-4, MR 1860617, Zbl 0951.35004.
- Maz'ya, Vladimir G.; Nazarov, Serguei; Plamenevskij, Boris (2000), Asymptotic Theory of Elliptic Boundary Value Problems in Singularly Perturbed Domains. Volume I, Operator Theory: Advances and Applications, vol. 110, Birkhäuser Verlag, pp. XXIV+435, ISBN 978-3-7643-6397-0, MR 1779977, Zbl 1127.35300.
- Maz'ya, Vladimir G.; Nazarov, Serguei; Plamenevskij, Boris (2000), Asymptotic Theory of Elliptic Boundary Value Problems in Singularly Perturbed Domains. Volume II, Operator Theory: Advances and Applications, vol. 112, Birkhäuser Verlag, pp. XXIV+323, ISBN 978-3-7643-6398-7, MR 1779978, Zbl 1127.35301.
- Kozlov, V. A.; Maz'ya, V. G.; Rossmann, Jürgen (2001), Spectral Problems Associated with Corner Singularities of Solutions to Elliptic Equations, Mathematical Surveys and Monographs, vol. 85, Providence, RI: American Mathematical Society, pp. x+436, ISBN 978-0-8218-2727-7, MR 1788991, Zbl 0965.35003.
- Kuznetsov, N.; Maz'ya, Vladimir; Vainberg, Boris (2002), Linear Water Waves. A Mathematical Approach, Cambridge: Cambridge University Press, pp. xviii+513, doi:10.1017/CBO9780511546778, ISBN 978-0-521-80853-8, MR 1925354, Zbl 0996.76001.
- Kresin, Gershon; Maz'ya, Vladimir G. (2007), Sharp Real-Part Theorems. A Unified Approach (PDF), Lecture Notes in Mathematics, vol. 1903, Berlin–Heidelberg–New York City: Springer-Verlag, pp. xvi+140, ISBN 978-3-540-69573-8, MR 2298774, Zbl 1117.30001.
- Maz'ya, Vladimir; Schmidt, Gunther (2007), Approximate approximations (PDF), Mathematical Surveys and Monographs, vol. 141, Providence, RI: American Mathematical Society, pp. xiv+349, doi:10.1090/surv/141, ISBN 978-0-8218-4203-4, MR 2331734, Zbl 1120.41013.
- Maz'ya, Vladimir G.; Shaposhnikova, Tatyana O. (2009) [1985], Theory of Sobolev multipliers. With applications to differential and integral operators, Grundlehren der Mathematischen Wissenschaft, vol. 337, Berlin–Heidelberg–New York: Springer-Verlag, pp. xiii+609, ISBN 978-3-540-69490-8, MR 2457601, Zbl 1157.46001.
- Maz'ya, Vladimir; Rossmann, Jürgen (2010), Elliptic Equations in Polyhedral Domains, Mathematical Surveys and Monographs, vol. 162, Providence, RI: American Mathematical Society, pp. viii+608, doi:10.1090/surv/162, ISBN 978-0-8218-4983-5, MR 2641539, Zbl 1196.35005.
- Maz'ya, Vladimir G.; Soloviev, Alexander A. (2010), Boundary Integral Equations on Contours with Peaks, Operator Theory: Advances and Applications, vol. 196, Basel: Birkhäuser Verlag, pp. vii+342, doi:10.1007/978-3-0346-0171-9, ISBN 978-3-0346-0170-2, MR 2584276, Zbl 1179.45001.
- Maz'ya, Vladimir G. (2011) [1985], Sobolev Spaces. With Applications to Elliptic Partial Differential Equations, Grundlehren der Mathematischen Wissenschaften, vol. 342 (2nd revised and augmented ed.), Berlin–Heidelberg–New York: Springer Verlag, pp. xxviii+866, doi:10.1007/978-3-642-15564-2, ISBN 978-3-642-15563-5, MR 2777530, Zbl 1217.46002.
- Kresin, Gershon; Maz'ya, Vladimir (2012), Maximum Principles and Sharp Constants for Solutions of Elliptic and Parabolic Systems, Mathematical Surveys and Monographs, vol. 183, Providence, RI: American Mathematical Society, pp. vii+317, doi:10.1090/surv/183, ISBN 978-0-8218-8981-7, MR 2962313, S2CID 118588520, Zbl 1255.35001.
- Maz'ya, Vladimir (2014), Differential equations of my young years, Basel: Birkhäuser Verlag, pp. xiii+191, doi:10.1007/978-3-319-01809-6, ISBN 978-3-319-01808-9, MR 3288312, Zbl 1303.01002 (also published with ISBN 978-3-319-01809-6). First Russian edition published as Владимир, Мазья (2020), Истории молодого математика, Saint Petersburg: Алетейя, p. 224, ISBN 978-5-00165-068-3.
- Maz'ya, V. G. (2018), Boundary behavior of solutions to elliptic equations in general domains, EMS Tracts in Mathematics, vol. 30, Zurich: European Mathematical Society, pp. x+431, doi:10.4171/190, ISBN 978-3-03719-190-3, MR 3839287, S2CID 125662951, Zbl 1409.35073

== See also ==
- Function space
- Multiplication operator
- Partial differential equation
- Potential theory
- Sobolev space
