= Solomon Mikhlin =

Soviet mathematician

Solomon Grigor'evich Mikhlin
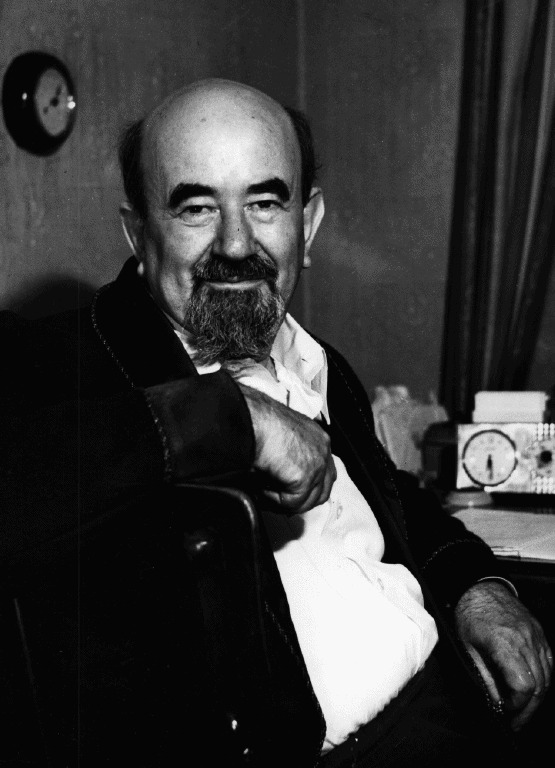
- Solomon Grigor'evich Mikhlin
- Born: 23 April 1908; Cholmieč, Rečyca Raion, Minsk Governorate, Russian Empire
- Died: 29 August 1990 (aged 82); Saint Petersburg (former Leningrad)
- Education: Leningrad University (1929)
- Known for: Elasticity theory; singular integrals; numerical analysis
- Awards: Order of the Badge of Honour (1961); Laurea honoris causa by the Karl-Marx-Stadt Polytechnic (1968); Membership of the German Academy of Sciences Leopoldina (1970); Membership of the Accademia Nazionale dei Lincei (1981)
- Scientific career
- Fields: Mathematics and mechanics
- Workplaces: Seismological Institute of the USSR Academy of Sciences (1932–1941); Kazakh University in Alma Ata (1941–1944); Leningrad University (now Saint Petersburg State University) (1944–1990)
- Academic advisors: Vladimir Smirnov, Leningrad University, master thesis
- Doctoral students: Tatyana O. Shaposhnikova
- Other notable students: Vladimir Maz'ya

Solomon Grigor'evich Mikhlin (Russian: Соломо́н Григо́рьевич Ми́хлин, real name Zalman Girshevich Mikhlin) (the family name is also transliterated as Mihlin or Michlin) (23 April 1908 – 29 August 1990) was a Soviet mathematician of who worked in the fields of linear elasticity, singular integrals and numerical analysis: he is best known for the introduction of the symbol of a singular integral operator, which eventually led to the foundation and development of the theory of pseudodifferential operators.

== Biography ==
He was born in Kholmech, Rechytsa District, Minsk Governorate (in present-day Belarus) on 23 April 1908; Mikhlin (1968) himself states in his resume that his father was a merchant, but this assertion could be untrue since, in that period, people sometimes lied on the profession of parents in order to overcome political limitations in the access to higher education. According to a different version, his father was a melamed, at a primary religious school (kheder), and that the family was of modest means: according to the same source, Zalman was the youngest of five children. His first wife was Victoria Isaevna Libina: Mikhlin's book (Mikhlin 1965) is dedicated to her memory. She died of peritonitis in 1961 during a boat trip on Volga. In 1940 they adopted a son, Grigory Zalmanovich Mikhlin, who later emigrated to Haifa, Israel. His second wife was Eugenia Yakovlevna Rubinova, born in 1918, who was his companion for the rest of his life.

=== Education and academic career ===
He graduated from a secondary school in Gomel in 1923 and entered the State Herzen Pedagogical Institute in 1925. In 1927 he was transferred to the Department of Mathematics and Mechanics of Leningrad State University as a second year student, passing all the exams of the first year without attending lectures. Among his university professors there were Nikolai Maximovich Günther and Vladimir Ivanovich Smirnov. The latter became his master thesis supervisor: the topic of the thesis was the convergence of double series, and was defended in 1929. Sergei Lvovich Sobolev studied in the same class as Mikhlin. In 1930 he started his teaching career, working in some Leningrad institutes for short periods, as Mikhlin himself records on the document (Mikhlin 1968). In 1932 he got a position at the Seismological Institute of the USSR Academy of Sciences, where he worked till 1941: in 1935 he got the degree of Doctor of Sciences in Mathematics and Physics, without having to earn the Candidate of Sciences degree, and finally in 1937 he was promoted to the rank of professor. During World War II he became professor at the Kazakh University in Alma Ata. Since 1944 S.G. Mikhlin has been professor at the Leningrad State University. From 1964 to 1986 he headed the Laboratory of Numerical Methods at the Research Institute of Mathematics and Mechanics of the same university: since 1986 until his death he was a senior researcher at that laboratory.

=== Honours ===
He received the order of the Badge of Honour (Russian: Орден Знак Почёта) in 1961: the name of the recipients of this prize was usually published in newspapers. He was awarded of the Laurea honoris causa by the Karl-Marx-Stadt (now Chemnitz) Polytechnic in 1968 and was elected member of the German Academy of Sciences Leopoldina in 1970 and of the Accademia Nazionale dei Lincei in 1981. As Fichera (1994, p. 51) states, in his country he did not receive honours comparable to his scientific stature, mainly because of the racial policy of the communist regime, briefly described in the following section.

==== Influence of communist antisemitism ====
He lived in one of the most difficult periods of contemporary Russian history. The state of mathematical sciences during this period is well described by Lorentz (2002): marxist ideology rise in the USSR universities and Academia was one of the main themes of that period. Local administrators and communist party functionaries interfered with scientists on either ethnical or ideological grounds. As a matter of fact, during the war and during the creation of a new academic system, Mikhlin did not experience the same difficulties as younger Soviet scientists of Jewish origin: for example he was included in the Soviet delegation in 1958, at the International Congress of Mathematicians in Edinburgh. However, Fichera (1994, pp. 56–60), examining the life of Mikhlin, finds it surprisingly similar to the life of Vito Volterra under the fascist regime. He notes that antisemitism in communist countries took different forms compared to his nazist counterpart: the communist regime aimed not to the brutal homicide of Jews, but imposed on them a number of constrictions, sometimes very cruel, in order to make their life difficult. During the period from 1963 to 1981, he met Mikhlin attending several conferences in the Soviet Union, and realised how he was in a state of isolation, almost marginalized inside his native community: Fichera describes several episodes revealing this fact. Perhaps, the most illuminating one is the election of Mikhlin as a member of the Accademia Nazionale dei Lincei: in June 1981, Solomon G. Mikhlin was elected Foreign Member of the class of mathematical and physical sciences of the Lincei. At first time, he was proposed as a winner of the Antonio Feltrinelli Prize, but the almost sure confiscation of the prize by the Soviet authorities induced the Lincei members to elect him as a member: they decided to honour him in a way that no political authority could alienate. However, Mikhlin was not allowed to visit Italy by the Soviet authorities, so Fichera and his wife brought the tiny golden lynx, the symbol of the Lincei membership, directly to Mikhlin's apartment in Leningrad on 17 October 1981: the only guests to that "ceremony" were Vladimir Maz'ya and his wife Tatyana Shaposhnikova.

They just have power, but we have theorems. Therefore we are stronger!

— Solomon G. Mikhlin, cited by Vladimir Maz'ya (2014, p. 142)

=== Death ===
According to Fichera (1994, pp. 60–61), which refers a conversation with Mark Vishik and Olga Oleinik, on 29 August 1990 Mikhlin left home to buy medicines for his wife Eugenia. On a public transport, he suffered a lethal stroke. He had no documents with him, therefore he was identified only some time after his death: this may be the cause of the difference in the death date reported on several biographies and obituary notices. Fichera also writes that Mikhlin's wife Eugenia survived him only a few months.

== Work ==
=== Research activity ===
He was author of monographs and textbooks which become classics for their style. His research is devoted mainly to the following fields.

==== Elasticity theory and boundary value problems ====
In mathematical elasticity theory, Mikhlin was concerned by three themes: the plane problem (mainly from 1932 to 1935), the theory of shells (from 1954) and the Cosserat spectrum (from 1967 to 1973). Dealing with the plane elasticity problem, he proposed two methods for its solution in multiply connected domains. The first one is based upon the so-called complex Green's function and the reduction of the related boundary value problem to integral equations. The second method is a certain generalization of the classical Schwarz algorithm for the solution of the Dirichlet problem in a given domain by splitting it in simpler problems in smaller domains whose union is the original one. Mikhlin studied its convergence and gave applications to special applied problems. He proved existence theorems for the fundamental problems of plane elasticity involving inhomogeneous anisotropic media: these results are collected in the book (Mikhlin 1957). Concerning the theory of shells, there are several Mikhlin's articles dealing with it. He studied the error of the approximate solution for shells, similar to plane plates, and found out that this error is small for the so-called purely rotational state of stress. As a result of his study of this problem, Mikhlin also gave a new (invariant) form of the basic equations of the theory. He also proved a theorem on perturbations of positive operators in a Hilbert space which let him to obtain an error estimate for the problem of approximating a sloping shell by a plane plate. Mikhlin studied also the spectrum of the operator pencil of the classical linear elastostatic operator or Navier–Cauchy operator

$$\boldsymbol{\mathcal{A}}(\omega)\boldsymbol{u}=\Delta_2\boldsymbol{u}+\omega\nabla\left(\nabla\cdot\boldsymbol{u}\right)$$

where $u$ is the displacement vector, $\scriptstyle\Delta_2$ is the vector laplacian, $\scriptstyle\nabla$ is the gradient, $\scriptstyle\nabla\cdot$ is the divergence and $\omega$ is a Cosserat eigenvalue. The full description of the spectrum and the proof of the completeness of the system of eigenfunctions are also due to Mikhlin, and partly to V.G. Maz'ya in their only joint work.

==== Singular integrals and Fourier multipliers ====
He is one of the founders of the multi-dimensional theory of singular integrals, jointly with Francesco Tricomi and Georges Giraud, and also one of the main contributors. By singular integral we mean an integral operator of the following form

$$Au = v(\boldsymbol{x}) = \int_{\mathbb{R}^n}\frac{f(\boldsymbol{x},\boldsymbol{\theta})}{r^n}u(\boldsymbol{y})\mathrm{d}\boldsymbol{y}$$

where $x \isin \mathbb{R}^n$ is a point in the n-dimensional euclidean space, $r$=|$y-x$| and $\scriptstyle\boldsymbol{\theta}=\frac{\boldsymbol{y}-\boldsymbol{x}}{r}$ are the hyperspherical coordinates (or the polar coordinates or the spherical coordinates respectively when $n=2$ or $n=3$) of the point $y$ with respect to the point $x$. Such operators are called singular since the singularity of the kernel of the operator is so strong that the integral does not exist in the ordinary sense, but only in the sense of Cauchy principal value. Mikhlin was the first to develop a theory of singular integral equations as a theory of operator equations in function spaces. In the papers (Mikhlin 1936a) and (Mikhlin 1936b) he found a rule for the composition of double singular integrals (i.e. in 2-dimensional euclidean spaces) and introduced the very important notion of symbol of a singular integral. This enabled him to show that the algebra of bounded singular integral operators is isomorphic to the algebra of either scalar or matrix-valued functions. He proved the Fredholm's theorems for singular integral equations and systems of such equations under the hypothesis of non-degeneracy of the symbol: he also proved that the index of a single singular integral equation in the euclidean space is zero. In 1961 Mikhlin developed a theory of multidimensional singular integral equations on Lipschitz spaces. These spaces are widely used in the theory of one-dimensional singular integral equations: however, the direct extension of the related theory to the multidimensional case meets some technical difficulties, and Mikhlin suggested another approach to this problem. Precisely, he obtained the basic properties of this kind of singular integral equations as a by-product of the L^{p}-space theory of these equations. Mikhlin also proved a now classical theorem on multipliers of Fourier transform in the L^{p}-space, based on an analogous theorem of Józef Marcinkiewicz on Fourier series. A complete collection of his results in this field up to the 1965, as well as the contributions of other mathematicians like Tricomi, Giraud, Calderón and Zygmund, is contained in the monograph (Mikhlin 1965).

A synthesis of the theories of singular integrals and linear partial differential operators was accomplished, in the mid 1960s, by the theory of pseudodifferential operators: Joseph J. Kohn, Louis Nirenberg, Lars Hörmander and others operated this synthesis, but this theory owe his rise to the discoveries of Mikhlin, as is universally acknowledged. This theory has numerous applications to mathematical physics. Mikhlin's multiplier theorem is widely used in different branches of mathematical analysis, particularly to the theory of differential equations. The analysis of Fourier multipliers was later forwarded by Lars Hörmander, Walter Littman, Elias Stein, Charles Fefferman and others.

==== Partial differential equations ====
In four papers, published in the period 1940–1942, Mikhlin applies the potentials method to the mixed problem for the wave equation. In particular, he solves the mixed problem for the two-space dimensional wave equation in the half plane by reducing it to the planar Abel integral equation. For plane domains with a sufficiently smooth curvilinear boundary he reduces the problem to an integro-differential equation, which he is also able to solve when the boundary of the given domain is analytic. In 1951 Mikhlin proved the convergence of the Schwarz alternating method for second order elliptic equations. He also applied the methods of functional analysis, at the same time as Mark Vishik but independently of him, to the investigation of boundary value problems for degenerate second order elliptic partial differential equations.

==== Numerical mathematics ====
His work in this field can be divided into several branches: in the following text, four main branches are described, and a sketch of his last researches is also given. The papers within the first branch are summarized in the monograph (Mikhlin 1964), which contain the study of convergence of variational methods for problems connected with positive operators, in particular, for some problems of mathematical physics. Both "a priori" and "a posteriori" estimates of the errors concerning the approximation given by these methods are proved. The second branch deals with the notion of stability of a numerical process introduced by Mikhlin himself. When applied to the variational method, this notion enables him to state necessary and sufficient conditions in order to minimize errors in the solution of the given problem when the error arising in the numerical construction of the algebraic system resulting from the application of the method itself is sufficiently small, no matter how large is the system's order. The third branch is the study of variational-difference and finite element methods. Mikhlin studied the completeness of the coordinate functions used in this methods in the Sobolev space W^{1,p}, deriving the order of approximation as a function of the smoothness properties of the functions to be approximation of functions approximated. He also characterized the class of coordinate functions which give the best order of approximation, and has studied the stability of the variational-difference process and the growth of the condition number of the variation-difference matrix. Mikhlin also studied the finite element approximation in weighted Sobolev spaces related to the numerical solution of degenerate elliptic equations. He found the optimal order of approximation for some methods of solution of variational inequalities. The fourth branch of his research in numerical mathematics is a method for the solution of Fredholm integral equations which he called resolvent method: its essence rely on the possibility of substituting the kernel of the integral operator by its variational-difference approximation, so that the resolvent of the new kernel can be expressed by simple recurrence relations. This eliminates the need to construct and solve large systems of equations. During his last years, Mikhlin contributed to the theory of errors in numerical processes, proposing the following classification of errors.

1. Approximation error: is the error due to the replacement of an exact problem by an approximating one.
2. Perturbation error: is the error due to the inaccuracies in the computation of the data of the approximating problem.
3. Algorithm error: is the intrinsic error of the algorithm used for the solution of the approximating problem.
4. Rounding error: is the error due to the limits of computer arithmetic.

This classification is useful since enables one to develop computational methods adjusted in order to diminish the errors of each particular type, following the divide et impera (divide and rule) principle.

=== Teaching activity ===
He was the doctoral advisor of Tatyana O. Shaposhnikova. He was also mentor and friend of Vladimir Maz'ya: he was never his official supervisor, but his friendship with the young undergraduate Maz'ya had a great influence on shaping his mathematical style.

== Selected publications ==
=== Books ===
- Mikhlin, S.G. (1957), Integral equations and their applications to certain problems in mechanics, mathematical physics and technology, International Series of Monographs in Pure and Applied Mathematics, vol. 5, Oxford–London–Edinburgh–New York–Paris–Frankfurt: Pergamon Press, pp. XII+338, Zbl 0077.09903. The book of Mikhlin summarizing his results in the plane elasticity problem: according to Fichera (1994, pp. 55–56) this is a widely known monograph in the theory of integral equations.
- Mikhlin, S.G. (1964), Variational methods in mathematical physics, International Series of Monographs in Pure and Applied Mathematics, vol. 50, Oxford–London–Edinburgh–New York–Paris–Frankfurt: Pergamon Press, pp. XXXII+584, Zbl 0119.19002.
- Mikhlin, S.G. (1965), Multidimensional singular integrals and integral equations, International Series of Monographs in Pure and Applied Mathematics, vol. 83, Oxford–London–Edinburgh–New York–Paris–Frankfurt: Pergamon Press, pp. XII+255, MR 0185399, Zbl 0129.07701. A masterpiece in the multidimensional theory of singular integrals and singular integral equations summarizing all the results from the beginning to the year of publication, and also sketching the history of the subject.
- Mikhlin, Solomon G.; Prössdorf, Siegfried (1986), Singular Integral Operators, Berlin–Heidelberg–New York: Springer Verlag, p. 528, ISBN 978-3-540-15967-4, MR 0867687, Zbl 0612.47024.
- Mikhlin, S.G. (1991), Error analysis in numerical processes, Pure and Applied Mathematics. A Wiley-Interscience Series of Text Monographs & Tracts, vol. 1237, Chichester: John Wiley & Sons, p. 283, ISBN 978-0-471-92133-2, MR 1129889, Zbl 0786.65038. This book summarize the contributions of Mikhlin and of the former Soviet school of numerical analysis to the problem of error analysis in numerical solutions of various kind of equations: it was also reviewed by Stummel (1993, pp. 204–206) for the Bulletin of the American Mathematical Society.
- Mikhlin, Solomon G.; Morozov, Nikita Fedorovich; Paukshto, Michael V. (1995), The integral equations of the theory of elasticity, Teubner-Texte zur Mathematik, vol. 135, Leipzig: Teubner Verlag, p. 375, doi:10.1007/978-3-663-11626-4, ISBN 3-8154-2060-1, MR 1314625, Zbl 0817.45004.

=== Papers ===
- Michlin, S.G. (1932), "Sur la convergence uniforme des séries de fonctions analytiques", Matematicheskii Sbornik (in French), 39 (3): 88–96, JFM 58.0302.03, Zbl 0006.31701.
- Mikhlin, Solomon G. (1936a), "Équations intégrales singulières à deux variables indépendantes", Recueil Mathématique (Matematicheskii Sbornik), New Series (in Russian), 1(43) (4): 535–552, Zbl 0016.02902. The paper, with French title and abstract, where Solomon Mikhlin introduces the symbol of a singular integral operator as a means to calculate the composition of such kind of operators and solve singular integral equations: the integral operators considered here are defined by integration on the whole n-dimensional (for n = 2) euclidean space.
- Mikhlin, Solomon G. (1936b), "Complément à l'article "Équations intégrales singulières à deux variables indépendantes", Recueil Mathématique (Matematicheskii Sbornik), New Series (in Russian), 1(43) (6): 963–964, JFM 62.1251.02. In this paper, with French title and abstract, Solomon Mikhlin extends the definition of the symbol of a singular integral operator introduced before in the paper (Mikhlin 1936a) to integral operators defined by integration on a (n − 1)-dimensional closed manifold (for n = 3) in n-dimensional euclidean space.
- Mikhlin, Solomon G. (1948), "Singular integral equations", Uspekhi Matematicheskikh Nauk (in Russian), 3 (25): 29–112, MR 0027429.
- Mikhlin, S.G. (1951), "On the Schwarz algorithm", Doklady Akademii Nauk SSSR, novaya Seriya (in Russian), 77: 569–571, Zbl 0054.04204.
- Mikhlin, Solomon G. (1952a), "An estimate of the error of approximating elastic shells by plane plates", Prikladnaya Matematika i Mekhanika (in Russian), 16 (4): 399–418, Zbl 0048.42304.
- Mikhlin, Solomon G. (1952b), "A theorem in operator theory and its application to the theory of elastic shells", Doklady Akademii Nauk SSSR, novaya Seriya (in Russian), 84: 909–912, Zbl 0048.42401.
- Mikhlin, Solomon G. (1956a), "The theory of multidimensional singular integral equations", Vestnik Leningradskogo Universiteta, Seriya Matematika, Mekhanika, Astronomija (in Russian), 11 (1): 3–24, Zbl 0075.11402.
- Mikhlin, Solomon G. (1956b), "On the multipliers of Fourier integrals", Doklady Akademii Nauk SSSR, New Series (in Russian), 109: 701–703, Zbl 0073.08402.
- Mikhlin, Solomon G. (1966), "On Cosserat functions", Probl. Mat. Analiza, kraevye Zadachi integral'nye Uravenya (in Russian), Leningrad, pp. 59–69, Zbl 0166.37505.
- Mikhlin, Solomon G. (1973), "The spectrum of a family of operators in the theory of elasticity", Uspekhi Matematicheskikh Nauk (in Russian), 28 (3(171)): 43–82, MR 0415422, Zbl 0291.35065
- Mikhlin, S.G. (1974), "On a method for the approximate solution of integral equations", Vestn. Leningr. Univ., Ser. Mat. Mekh. Astron. (in Russian), 13 (3): 26–33, Zbl 0308.45014.

== See also ==
- Linear elasticity
- Mikhlin multiplier theorem
- Multiplier (Fourier analysis)
- Singular integrals
- Singular integral equations
