= Mazia (surname) =

Mazia, Mazya, Maz'ya (Hebrew: מזי"א) is a surname. Notable people with the surname include

- Aharon Meir Mazia (1858–1930), Israeli doctor and linguist
- Daniel Mazia
- Edna Mazia
- Vladimir Mazya, Russian-born Swedish mathematician
