= Andreas Seeger =

Mathematician

Andreas Seeger is a mathematician who works in the field of harmonic analysis. He is a professor of mathematics at the University of Wisconsin–Madison. He received his PhD from Technische Universität Darmstadt in 1985 under the supervision of Walter Trebels.

He was elected a fellow of the American Mathematical Society in 2014 for his contributions to Fourier integral operators, local smoothing, oscillatory integrals, and Fourier multipliers. In 2017, he was awarded the Humboldt Prize. He was awarded a Simons Fellowship in 2019.
