= Faizo Shamoyan =

Russian Yazidi mathematician

- Файзо Агитович Шамоян
- Born: 28 January 1945 (age 81); Baysiz, Talin District, Armenian SSR, Soviet Union
- Alma mater: Yerevan State University (1966); Leningrad State University (Kandidat, 1971)
- Awards: Soros Professor (1991) Honorary Worker of Higher Professional Education of the Russian Federation (2002)
- Scientific career
- Fields: Complex analysis, functional analysis
- Workplaces: Institute of Mathematics, Armenian Academy of Sciences; Yerevan State University; Bryansk State University; Saratov State University
- Theses: Некоторые проблемы деления в пространствах аналитических функций (1971); Факторизация, интегральные представления и идеалы аналитических функций (1983)

Faizo Agitovich Shamoyan (Russian: Файзо Агитович Шамоян; Kurmanji Kurdish: Feyzoyê Egîtê Reşîd Şamoyan; born 28 January 1945) is a Soviet mathematician of Armenian-Yazidi heritage who works on complex and functional analysis, in particular spaces of analytic functions. He is doctor of physical and mathematical sciences and professor. He held a professorship at Yerevan State University from 1987 to 1993, has been the head the Department of Mathematical Analysis at Bryansk State University since 1991, and a professor at Saratov State University since 2016.

== Personal life and education ==
Shamoyan was born on 28 January 1945 in a Yazidi family in the village of Baysiz in Armenia's Talin District. He graduated from the mechanics and mathematics faculty of Yerevan State University in 1966, sitting the final examinations as an external student, and then entered postgraduate study at Leningrad State University. He was the second person after Sergey Mergelyan in the history of Yerevan State University to graduate in four years instead of five years. Alongside studying, he married Heciyê Cindî's youngest daughter Nazê.

He defended his kandidat dissertation there in 1971, on division problems in spaces of analytic functions. In 1983 he defended a doctoral dissertation on factorization, integral representations and ideals of analytic functions at the Leningrad branch of the Steklov Institute of Mathematics. His research was on the most difficult problems in mathematics and the thesis he refined is known in the world of mathematics as the "Shamoyan thesis".

His brother, Hesenê Egît, who passed away in an accident was also a Doctor of Mathematics. Faizo's son, Romoyê Feyzo, is a Doctor of Mathematics and Physics currently working in Washington D.C, and his daughter, Sona Feyzo, is a Doctor of Medical Sciences working in the city of Vladimir, Russia.

In September 2020, Kurdistan 24 aired a documentary about Shamoyan by its correspondent Khoshavi Mohammed.

== Career ==
From 1971 to 1993 Shamoyan worked at the Institute of Mathematics of the Armenian Academy of Sciences while teaching in the Department of Function Theory and Functional Analysis at Yerevan State University, first as a docent (1971–1986) and then as a professor (1987–1993). The Soviet Higher Attestation Commission confirmed his professorial rank in 1987.

In the 1990s he moved to Bryansk State University, where he has been head of the Department of Mathematical Analysis since 1991. He built a research school in complex and functional analysis in Bryansk Oblast and organized a laboratory on the subject. Faizo Agitovich has participated in various international conferences on mathematical analysis, both in Russia and abroad. Under his supervision, more than 100 master's, postgraduate, candidate, and doctoral students have defended their dissertations, who now work in Russia and Armenia. 13 dissertations for the degree of Candidate of Physical and Mathematical Sciences were defended, and one of his students became a Doctor of Sciences. He is the author of more than 100 scientific papers in leading Russian and international publications, as well as three monographs. He has presented numerous papers at leading universities in Russia, Hungary, Italy, Germany, Sweden, Norway, and France. Since 2016 he has been a professor in the Department of Mathematical Analysis at Saratov State University.

His Saratov profile lists several grants from the Russian Foundation for Basic Research between 1996 and 2016, a joint Russian–French RFBR project for 2017–2019, and funding from the Russian Science Foundation for 2014–2016. It also records his participation in international conferences, among them Budapest (1988), Linköping and Trondheim (1996), Pisa (2000) and Bordeaux (2011), and his membership of the organizing committee of the Smolensk conference series "Computer mathematics systems and their applications" from 1998 to 2017.

== Research ==
Shamoyan's work concerns weighted spaces of analytic functions in the disc, polydisc and ball, including zero sets, parametric representations, closed ideals, weakly invertible elements, Toeplitz operators and diagonal maps. With Ashot E. Djrbashian he wrote Topics in the Theory of A^{p}_{α} Spaces (in Teubner-Texte zur Mathematik, vol. 105; Leipzig: Teubner, 1988). As well as later authoring monographs Weighted spaces of analytic functions with mixed norm (Bryansk, 2014) and Weighted spaces of analytic functions in the polydisc and the ball (Bryansk, 2016).

In 1984 he contributed an entry on invariant subspaces of the shift operator in spaces of analytic functions to the Linear and Complex Analysis Problem Book (Lecture Notes in Mathematics, vol. 1043).

His 2016 paper gives a condition, in terms of the Fourier transform, for an analytic function of bounded type in a tube domain to belong to the Hardy class H^{1}. His 2015 paper gives necessary and sufficient conditions on a weight function under which an inner function is weakly invertible in a weighted space of holomorphic functions on a tubular domain. With Vera Bednazh he described the integrable symbols for which a Toeplitz operator is bounded in weighted Sobolev-type spaces of analytic functions in the disc, and applied the result to factorization problems. With Evgeniya Rodikova he solved an interpolation problem for analytic functions in the unit disc with power growth of the Nevanlinna characteristic, where the interpolation nodes lie in a finite union of Stolz angles.

=== Selected publications ===
- Djrbashian, Ashot E.; Shamoian, Faizo A. (1988). Topics in the Theory of A^{p}_{α} Spaces. Teubner-Texte zur Mathematik. Vol. 105. Leipzig: B. G. Teubner. ISBN 3-322-00495-3.
- Shamoyan, F. A. (1993). "Замкнутые идеалы в алгебрах аналитических в круге функций и гладких вплоть до его границы" [Closed ideals in algebras of functions analytic in the disc and smooth up to its boundary]. Matematicheskii Sbornik (in Russian). 184 (8): 109–136.
- Shamoyan, F. A. (1999). "Parametric representation and description of the root sets of weighted classes of functions holomorphic in the disk". Siberian Mathematical Journal. 40 (6): 1422–1440.
- Shamoyan, F. A. (2002). "Слабо обратимые элементы в весовых анизотропных пространствах голоморфных в поликруге функций" [Weakly invertible elements in weighted anisotropic spaces of functions holomorphic in the polydisc]. Matematicheskii Sbornik (in Russian). 193 (6): 143–160.
- Shamoyan, F. A. (2016). "On Fourier transforms of functions of bounded type in tubular domains". Siberian Mathematical Journal. 57 (6): 1403–1421. doi:10.1134/S0037446616060173.

== Honours ==
He was awarded the honorary title of Soros Professor in 1991 and, from 2002, the title "Honorary Worker of Higher Professional Education of the Russian Federation". He received certificates of honour from the Russian Ministry of Education and from the governor of Bryansk Oblast.

== See also ==
- List of Yazidi people
