= Mikhlin =

Mikhlin, Mihlin or Michlin is a Russian Jewish matronymic surname derived from the Jewish feminine given name Mikhla/Michla (Hebrew: מיכלה). Notable people with this surname include:

- Aleksandr Mikhlin (1930–2007), Soviet and Russian lawyer and legal theorist, colonel of the Ministry of Internal Affairs
- Aleksey Mikhlin (born 1938), Soviet violinist
- Solomon Mikhlin (1908–1990), Soviet mathematician
