= Doklady Physics =

- Discipline: Physics and astronomy
- Language: English
- Edited by: Sergey V. Garnov

Publication details
- Former names: Soviet Physics-Doklady, Physics-Doklady
- History: 1956-present
- Publisher: MAIK Nauka/Interperiodica and Springer Science+Business Media (Russia)
- Frequency: Monthly
- Impact factor: 0.679 (2020)

Standard abbreviations
- ISO 4: Dokl. Phys.

Indexing
- CODEN: DOPHFU
- ISSN: 1028-3358 (print); 1562-6903 (web)
- LCCN: 98646622
- OCLC no.: 312931650

Links
- Journal homepage; Online archive; Journal page at MAIK Nauka/Interperiodica website

Doklady Physics: A Journal of the Russian Academy of Sciences is a monthly peer-reviewed scientific journal published by MAIK Nauka/Interperiodica and Springer Science+Business Media. This journal covers Russian to English translations of physics, technical physics, astronomy, and mechanics articles from Doklady Akademii Nauk (English: Proceedings of the Russian Academy of Sciences). The editor-in-chief is Sergey V. Garnov (Prokhorov General Physics Institute). The journal was established in 1956 as Soviet Physics-Doklady and renamed Physics-Doklady in 1993, before obtaining its current title in 1998.

== Abstracting and indexing ==
This journal is abstracted and indexed in:

- Current Contents/Physical, Chemical and Earth Sciences
- Science Citation Index
- Chemical Abstracts Service
- Compendex
- Scopus
- Inspec
- Current Mathematical Publications
- Zentralblatt Math

According to the Journal Citation Reports, the journal has a 2013 impact factor of 0.473.
