= Metric tangent cone =

Concept in metric geometry

In metric geometry, the metric tangent cone of a metric space is a generalization of the tangent space from Riemannian geometry. It is obtained as a local blow up of the metric space at a point, taken using Gromov–Hausdorff convergence. It is also called a Gromov tangent cone, or simply a tangent cone when the metric setting is clear. It is related to the notion of a tangent cone: for a Riemannian manifold with singularities, for example, it is the ordinary tangent cone.

== Definition ==
Let $(X,d)$ be a metric space and let $x\in X$. A pointed metric space $(Y,d_Y,o)$ is called a metric tangent space of $X$ at $x$ if there is a sequence of positive numbers $r_i\to 0$ such that
$$(X,r_i^{-1}d,x)\to (Y,d_Y,o)$$
in the pointed Gromov–Hausdorff topology. The base point $o$ is the image, in the limiting space, of the point about which the original space is blown up.

== Properties ==
A Gromov tangent space records the first-order metric geometry of a space at a point. It is invariant under local isometry and under uniform rescaling of the original metric. If a tangent space is unique, then rescaling the tangent space again gives an isometric tangent space, so uniqueness implies a form of metric self-similarity. The word "cone" denotes this self-similarity under dilations.

Existence is not automatic for arbitrary metric spaces. It is usually obtained from compactness theorems, such as Gromov compactness, together with local hypotheses such as properness, local compactness, doubling estimates, or curvature bounds. Even when tangent spaces exist, they may depend on the sequence $r_i\to0$.

== Examples ==
=== Euclidean and Riemannian spaces ===
For $\mathbb R^n$ with its Euclidean metric, the Gromov tangent space at every point is again $\mathbb R^n$. This is because the rescaled metric space is already isometric with the original Euclidean space. More generally, if $M$ is a smooth $n$-dimensional Riemannian manifold, then the Gromov tangent space at $p\in M$ is the ordinary tangent vector space $T_pM$ equipped with the Euclidean norm induced by the Riemannian metric.

For spaces with boundary or singularities, the tangent space may cease to be a vector space. For example, the metric tangent at a smooth boundary point of a Riemannian manifold with boundary is modeled on a Euclidean half-space.

=== Sub-Riemannian geometry ===
In sub-Riemannian geometry, Gromov tangent spaces are typically non-Euclidean. At a regular point of a sub-Riemannian manifold, Mitchell's theorem identifies the pointed Gromov–Hausdorff tangent cone with a nilpotent approximation of the bracket-generating distribution, equipped with its Carnot–Carathéodory metric. In particular, the tangent object is a Carnot group in the equiregular case. Carnot groups thus serve as infinitesimal model spaces in sub-Riemannian analysis, replacing the Euclidean spaces that are the infinitesimal models of Riemannian geometry.
