= Boris Rufimovich Vainberg =

Boris Rufimovich Vainberg (Russian: Бори́с Руфи́мович Ва́йнберг) is a professor of mathematics at the University of North Carolina at Charlotte. He was born in 1938. He received his Dr.S. from Moscow State University, under the supervision of Samarii Galpern. He taught mathematics at Moscow State University for nearly 30 years, then held a visiting professor position at the University of Delaware before taking his current position at UNCC.

His research concerns differential equations, scattering theory, and spectral theory. A survey of his research and publications is also presented in an article on his 80th birthday in the Russian Mathematical Surveys (Russian) and (English).

== Publications ==
=== Books ===
- Asymptotic Methods in Equations of Mathematical Physics, 1982 (in Russian).
- Asymptotic Methods in Equations of Mathematical Physics (revised and expanded English version), Gordon and Breach Science Publishers, New York--London, 1989
- Linear Water Waves: A Mathematical Approach, Cambridge University Press, 2002 (with N. Kuznetsov and V. Maz'ya)

=== Book chapters ===
Large Time Asymptotic Expansion of the Solutions of Exterior Boundary Value Problems for Hyperbolic Equations and Quasiclassical Approximations, Chapter in "Partial Differential Equations, V", 1999, Springer-Verlag, Berlin-Heidelberg-New York, Series: Encyclopaedia of Math. Sciences.

=== Papers ===
He has written over 170 published papers.
