= Bryansk State University =

- Брянский государственный университет имени академика И. Г. Петровского
- Type: Public
- Established: 1930
- Rector: Andrey Antyukhov
- Location: Bezhitskaya 14, Bryansk, Russia; 53°16′20″N 34°21′03″E
- Campus: urban
- Website: http://www.brgu.ru
- Building details
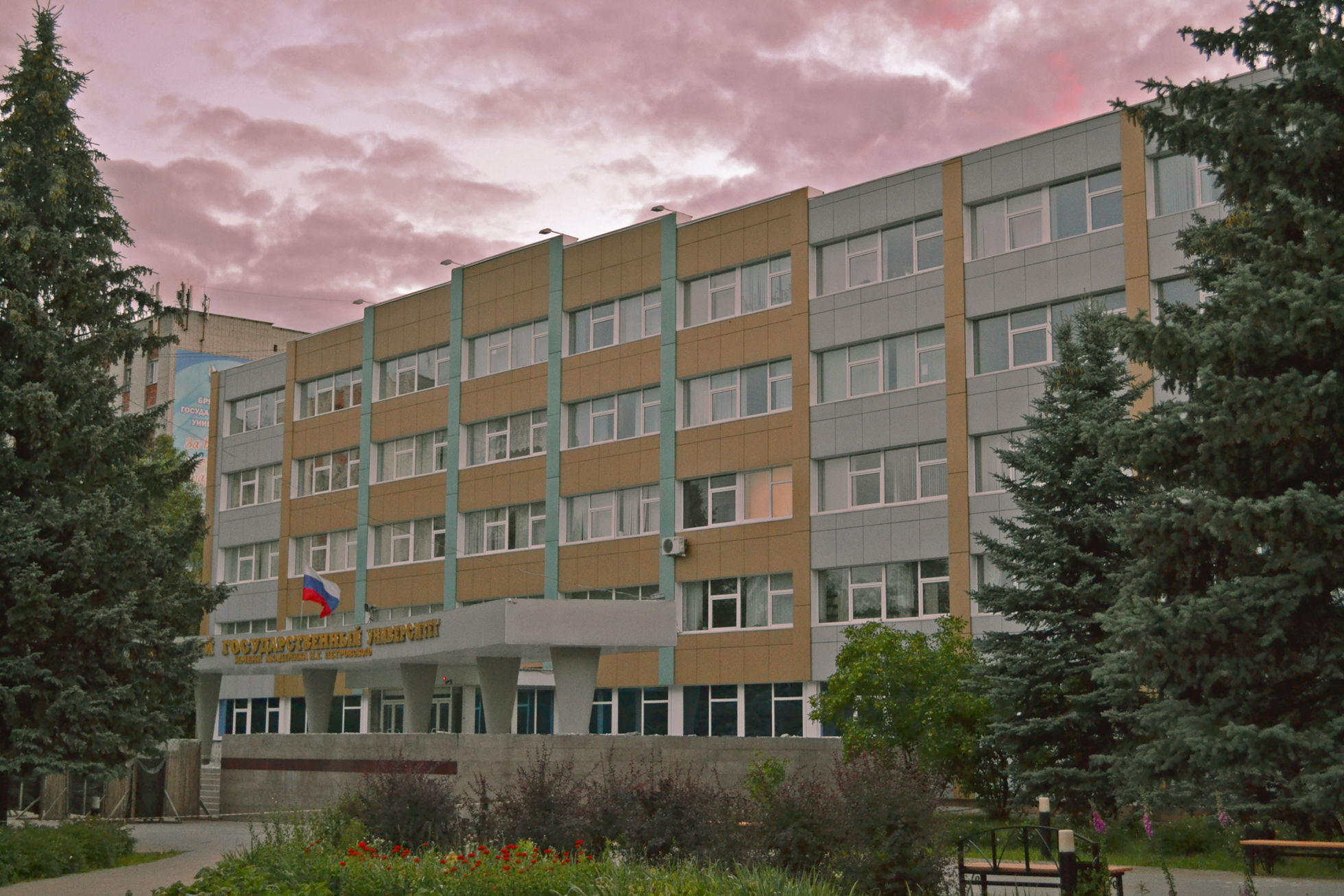
- Main campus building, June 2014

Ivan Petrovsky Bryansk State University (Russian: Брянский государственный университет имени академика И. Г. Петровского) is a university in Bryansk, Bryansk Oblast, Russia.

== History ==
In 1930 was founded Novozybkov State Pedagogical Institute. In 1976 it was transferred to Bryansk and renamed the Bryansk State Pedagogical Institute (Council of Ministers of the RSFSR of February 12, 1976 №102). The Council of Ministers of the RSFSR of August 18, 1976 №460 Bryansk State Pedagogical Institute was named after Academician Ivan Petrovsky. According to order of the State Committee of the Russian Federation for Higher Education on April 13, 1995 № 545 Bryansk State Pedagogical Institute named after Academician IG Petrovskii was renamed in Bryansk State Pedagogical University named after Academician Ivan Petrovsky. In accordance with the order №2292 of the Ministry of Education of Russia dated June 6, 2001 Bryansk State Pedagogical University was renamed in Bryansk State University.

== Notable people ==
- Faizo Shamoyan
