= Paratingent cone =

In mathematics, the paratingent cone and contingent cone were introduced by Bouligand (1932), and are closely related to tangent cones.

== Definition ==
Let $S$ be a nonempty subset of a real normed vector space $(X, \|\cdot\|)$.

1. Let some $\bar{x} \in \operatorname{cl}(S)$ be a point in the closure of $S$. An element $h \in X$ is tangent to $S$ at $\bar{x}$ if there is a sequence $(x_n)_{n\in \mathbb{N}}$ of elements $x_n \in S$ and a sequence $(\lambda_n)_{n\in\mathbb{N}}$ of positive real numbers $\lambda_n > 0$ such that $\bar{x} = \lim_{n \to \infty} x_n$ and $h = \lim_{n \to \infty} \lambda_n (x_n - \bar{x}).$
2. The set $T(S,\bar{x})$ of all $h \in X$ that are tangent to $S$ at $\bar{x}$ is called the contingent cone (or the Bouligand tangent cone) to $S$ at $\bar{x}$.

An equivalent definition is given in terms of a distance function and the limit infimum. As before, let $(X, \|\cdot \|)$ be a normed vector space and take some nonempty set $S \subset X$. For each $x \in X$, let the distance function to $S$ be

$$d_S(x) := \inf\{\|x - x'\| \mid x' \in S\}.$$

Then, the contingent cone to $S \subset X$ at $x \in \operatorname{cl}(S)$ is defined by

$$T_S(x) := \left\{v : \liminf_{h \to 0^+} \frac{d_S(x + hv)}{h} = 0 \right\}.$$
