= Georges Giraud =

French mathematician (1889–1943)

- Born: 22 July 1889; Saint-Étienne
- Died: 16 March 1943 (aged 53); Bonny-sur-Loire
- Education: École Normale Supérieure 1915
- Known for: potential theory; partial differential equations; singular integrals; singular integral equations
- Awards: Prix Francœur (1919); Prix Gustave Roux (1923); Hirn Foundation prize (1925 and 1935); Grand Prix for mathematical sciences (1928); Prix Houllevigue (1930); Lasserre foundation prize (1930); Prix Saintour (1933); Prize of the Annali della Reale Scuola Normale Superiore di Pisa (1935)
- Scientific career
- Workplaces: Université Clermont-Ferrand (now Université Blaise Pascal).
- Doctoral advisor: Charles Émile Picard

Georges Julien Giraud (22 July 1889 – 16 March 1943) was a French mathematician, working in potential theory, partial differential equations, singular integrals and singular integral equations: he is mainly known for his solution of the regular oblique derivative problem and also for his extension to n–dimensional (n ≥ 2) singular integral equations of the concept of symbol of a singular integral, previously introduced by Solomon Mikhlin.

== Biography ==
=== Honors ===
Georges Giraud a été plusieurs fois lauréat de notre Académie.

— Élie Cartan, (Cartan 1943, p. 518).

The scientific work of Georges Giraud was widely acknowledged and earned him several prizes, mainly, but not exclusively, awarded him by the French Academy of Sciences: he was seven times recipient of academy prizes.

In 1919, he was awarded the "Prix Francœur" for his work on the theory of automorphic functions: the members of the commission who examined his work and nominated him were Camille Jordan, Paul Appell, Marie Georges Humbert, Jacques Hadamard, Édouard Goursat, Joseph Boussinesq, Léon Lecornu and Émile Picard (the relator). For the same motivation, On 17 December 1923 he was awarded the "Gustave Roux" prize.

In 1924 he won the Hirn Foundation Prize, for his whole scientific work: he won again the same prize in 1935, for his work on singularities of boundary value problems in the theory of partial differential equations.

In 1928 Giraud won the "Grand Prix des sciences Mathématiques" for his work in the theory of partial differential equations: for the same motivation, in 1930 he was also awarded the "Prix Houllevigue". In the same year, he was also awarded the prize of the Lasserre foundation.

In 1933 he was recipient of the Prix Saintour, for his work on partial differential and integral equations.

Finally, in 1935, apart from winning the Hirn foundation prize for a second time, he was awarded the prize of the Annali della Reale Scuola Normale Superiore di Pisa, equally divided between him, Guido Ascoli and Pietro Buzano: the members of the jury who awarded ex-aequo the prize were Guido Fubini, Mauro Picone and Giovanni Sansone.

On 14 December 1936, following up a proposal Jacques Hadamard made since 1931, he was elected corresponding member of the French Academy of Sciences.

He was also a member of the Société Mathématique de France from 1913 to his death.

== Selected publications ==
=== Articles ===
- Giraud, Georges (1915), "Sur une classe de groupes discontinus de transformations birationnelles quadratiques et sur les fonctions de trois variables indépendantes restant invariables par ces transformations" [On a class of discontinuous groups of birational quadratic transformations and the functions of three independent variables which are invariant respect to these transformations], Annales Scientifiques de l'École Normale Supérieure, Série 3 (in French), 32: 237–403, doi:10.24033/asens.688, hdl:2027/mdp.39015061773670, JFM 45.1410.03.
- Giraud, Georges (1934), "Équations à intégrales principales; étude suivie d'une application" [Principal integral equations; a study followed by an application], Annales Scientifiques de l'École Normale Supérieure, 3 (in French), 51: 251–372, doi:10.24033/asens.842, MR 1509344, Zbl 0011.21604, available at NUMDAM. This is one of the first papers, together with independent works of Francesco Tricomi and Solomon Mikhlin, dealing with the multidimensional theory of singular integrals.
- Giraud, Georges (29 June 1936), "Sur une classe générale d'équations à intégrales principales" [On a general class of principal integral equations], Comptes rendus hebdomadaires des séances de l'Académie des sciences (in French), 202, Paris: 2124–2127, JFM 62.0498.01, Zbl 0014.30903, available at Gallica. In this short note, Giraud extends (without proof) the formula for the composition of two 2-dimensional singular integral operators using their symbols, introduced shortly before by Solomon Grigor'evich Mikhlin, to higher dimensional singular integrals.

=== Books ===
- Giraud, Georges (22 January 1916), Sur une classe de groupes discontinus de transformations birationnelles quadratiques et sur les fonctions de trois variables indépendantes restant invariables par ces transformations [On a class of discontinuous groups of birational quadratic transformations and the functions of three independent variables which are invariant respect to these transformations], Thèse (in French), Paris: Gauthier-Villars, pp. viii+167, JFM 46.0621.02. Georges Giraud's doctoral thesis, published also as (Giraud 1915).
- Giraud, Georges (1920), Leçons sur les fonctions automorphes. Fonctions automorphes de n variables, fonctions de Poincaré [Lectures on automorphic functions. Automorphic functions of n variables, Poincaré's functions], Collection de monographies sur la théorie des fonctions (in French), Paris: Gauthier-Villars, p. 123, JFM 47.0366.01, available from the Internet Archive.
- Bouligand, G.; Giraud, G.; Delens, P. (1935), "Le problème de la dérivée oblique en théorie du potentiel" [The oblique derivative problem in potential theory], Actualités Scientifiques et Industrielles (in French) (219), Paris: Hermann: 78, JFM 61.1263.01, Zbl 0012.16605, reviewed also by Murnaghan, F. D. (1936), "Review: G. Bouligand, G. Giraud and P. Delens, Le Problème de la Dérivée Oblique en Theorie du Potentiel", Bulletin of the American Mathematical Society, 42 (11): 794, doi:10.1090/S0002-9904-1936-06438-4.
- Ascoli, G.; Burgatti, P.; Giraud, G. (1936), Equazioni alle derivate parziali dei tipi ellittico e parabolico [Partial differential equations of elliptic and parabolic type] (in Italian), Florence: Sansoni Editore, pp. IV + 186, JFM 62.0547.04 (available from the "Edizione Nazionale Mathematica Italiana"). A book collecting the winning papers of the 1935 prize of the Annali della Reale Scuola Normale Superiore di Pisa.

== See also ==
- Cauchy principal value
- Potential theory
- Singular integral
