= Symplectic category =

In mathematics, Weinstein's symplectic category is (roughly) a category whose objects are symplectic manifolds and whose morphisms are canonical relations, inclusions of Lagrangian submanifolds L into $M \times N^{-}$, where the superscript minus means minus the given symplectic form (for example, the graph of a symplectomorphism; hence, minus). The notion was introduced by Alan Weinstein, according to whom "Quantization problems suggest that the category of symplectic manifolds and symplectomorphisms be augmented by the inclusion of canonical relations as morphisms." The composition of canonical relations is given by a fiber product.

Strictly speaking, the symplectic category is not a well-defined category (since the composition may not be well-defined) without some transversality conditions.

== See also ==
- Fourier integral operator
