= Oscillatory integral operator =

Class of integral and differential operator

In mathematics, in the field of harmonic analysis, an oscillatory integral operator is an integral operator of the form

$$T_\lambda u(x)=\int_{\R^n}e^{i\lambda S(x, y)} a(x, y) u(y)\,dy, \qquad x\in\R^m, \quad y\in\R^n,$$

where the function S(x,y) is called the phase of the operator and the function a(x,y) is called the symbol of the operator. λ is a parameter. One often considers S(x,y) to be real-valued and smooth, and a(x,y) smooth and compactly supported. Usually one is interested in the behavior of T_{λ} for large values of λ.

Oscillatory integral operators often appear in many fields of mathematics (analysis, partial differential equations, integral geometry, number theory) and in physics. Properties of oscillatory integral operators have been studied by Elias Stein and his school.

== Hörmander's theorem ==
The following bound on the L^{2} → L^{2} action of oscillatory integral operators (or L^{2} → L^{2} operator norm) was obtained by Lars Hörmander in his paper on Fourier integral operators:

Assume that x,y ∈ R^{n}, n ≥ 1. Let S(x,y) be real-valued and smooth, and let a(x,y) be smooth and compactly supported. If $\det_{j,k} \frac{\partial^2 S}{\partial x_j \, \partial y_k}(x,y)\ne 0$ everywhere on the support of a(x,y), then there is a constant C such that T_{λ}, which is initially defined on smooth functions, extends to a continuous operator from L^{2}(R^{n}) to L^{2}(R^{n}), with the norm bounded by $C \lambda^{-n/2}$, for every λ ≥ 1:

$$\|T_\lambda\|_{L^2(\mathbf{R}^n)\to L^2(\mathbf{R}^n)}\le C\lambda^{-n/2}.$$

== See also ==
- Oscillatory integral
- Microlocal analysis
