= Georges Bouligand =

French mathematician (1889–1979)

Georges Louis Bouligand (13 October 1889 – 12 April 1979) was a French mathematician. He worked in analysis, mechanics, analytical and differential geometry, topology, and mathematical physics. He is known for introducing the concept of paratingent cones and contingent cones.

== Biography ==
Georges Bouligand was received at both the École Polytechnique and the École Normale Supérieure in 1909, and chose the latter. He graduated in mathematics in 1912, and with the help of a scholarship from the Commercy Foundation, he prepared a thesis, defended in 1914, “On the Green and Neumann functions of the cylinder”. He was then appointed to Tours high school, then to the high school of Rennes where he taught the class in specialised mathematics (Mathématiques spéciales).

In 1921, after a year as a docent at the Faculty of Sciences of Rennes, he obtained the chair of rational mechanics at the Faculty of Sciences of Poitiers, then the chair of differential and integral calculus, after the departure for Paris of René Garnier. He was appointed to the Sorbonne in 1938, but it was only in 1948 that he took up the chair of Applications of Analysis to Geometry, which he kept until his retirement on September 30, 1961.

== Selected works ==
- (1924). Leçons de géométrie vectorielle préliminaires à l'étude de la théorie d'Einstein. Libraire Vuibert, Paris.
- (1925). Précis de mécanique rationnelle à l'usage des élèves des facultés des sciences. Libraire Vuibert, Paris.
- (1932). Introduction à la Géométrie Infinitésimale Directe, Gauthier-Villars, Paris.
- (1934). La Causalité des Théories Mathématiques. Hermann, Paris.
- (1935). Les Definitions Modernes de la Dimension. Hermann, Paris.
- Bouligand, G.; Giraud, G.; Delens, P. (1935), Le problème de la dérivée oblique en théorie du potentiel, Actualités Scientifiques et Industrielles (in French), Paris: Hermann, p. 78, JFM 61.1263.01, Zbl 0012.16605.
- (1945). Précis de mécanique rationnelle à l'usage des élèves des facultés des sciences. Vuibert.

== See also ==
- Minkowski–Bouligand dimension
