= Weighted space =

In mathematics, specifically functional analysis, a weighted space is a function space equipped with a weighted norm, which is a finite norm (or semi-norm) that involves multiplication by a particular weight function.

Weights can be used to expand or reduce a space of considered functions. For example, in the space of functions from a set $U\subset\mathbb{R}$ to $\mathbb{R}$ under the norm $\|\cdot\|_U$ defined by $\textstyle\|f\|_U=\sup_{x\in U}{|f(x)|}$, functions that have infinity as a limit point are excluded. However, the weighted norm

$$\|f\|=\sup_{x\in U}{\left|\frac{f(x)}{1+x^2}\right|}$$

is finite for many more functions, so the associated space contains more functions. Alternatively, the weighted norm

$$\|f\|=\sup_{x\in U}{\left|f(x)(1 + x^4)\right|}$$

is finite for many fewer functions. When the weight is of the form $\tfrac{1}{1+x^m}$, the weighted space is called polynomial-weighted.
