= Royal Society of Sciences in Uppsala =

Swedish royal academy

Coordinates: 59.8587°N 17.6321°E

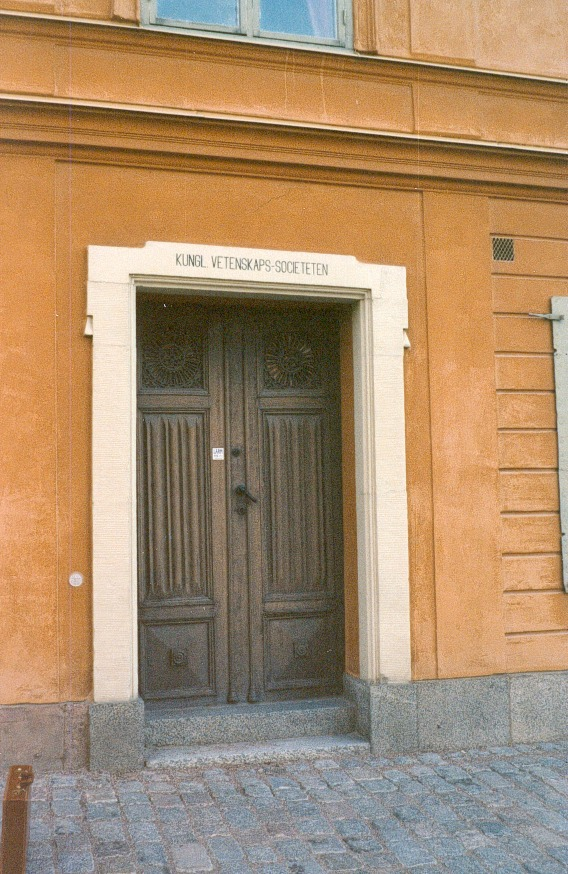
Detail of the building of the Royal Swedish Society of Sciences in Uppsala.

The Royal Society of Sciences in Uppsala (Swedish: Kungliga Vetenskaps-Societeten i Uppsala), is the oldest of the royal academies in Sweden, having been founded in 1710. The society has, by royal decree of 1906, 50 Swedish fellows and 100 foreign.

Early members included Emanuel Swedenborg and Anders Celsius.

The Royal Swedish Academy of Sciences was founded in Stockholm 1739. Its founders, some of whom were members of the Uppsala academy, specifically wanted a different academy.

== Historical sketch ==
The academy was founded 1710 in Uppsala on the initiative of the university librarian Erik Benzelius (jr) (later archbishop) under the name of Collegium curiosorum. The name was changed to Societas Literaria Sueciae in 1719, when it received a royal charter in 1728 to Societas regia literaria et scientarium, and it was known from the mid 18th century as the Societas regia scientarum upsaliensis. All the academy's publications were in the Latin language until 1863.

== Structure ==
The academy has 130 national members and 100 foreign members, belonging to one of the four "classes": the "Mathematical-Physical" class, the "Natural history-Medical" class, the "Historical-Archeological" class and the "Technical-Economical" class. All the sections are ruled by a single Presidium, which is formed by a president, a vice-president, a secretary, a vice-secretary and a treasurer: the king of Sweden is the Honorary President of the academy.

== Prizes ==
The prizes awarded by the academy are as follows:

- Linnaeus prize: the oldest prize awarded by the academy, named after Carl Linnaeus: the prize was instituted upon a donation by Linnaeus widow, Sara E. Linnaeus, on 8 September 1803.
- Celsius Gold Medal is the most prestigious prize awarded by the academy, named after Anders Celsius. It was first awarded in 1961, and it is reserved to scientists working in mathematical and physical sciences, and as such, it is awarded upon decision by the "Mathematical-Physical class" of the academy.
- Bergstedt prize is the second oldest prize awarded by the academy, instituted on 12 May 1827, upon a donation by the Secretary of State Erik Bergstedt.
- Thalen prize was instituted in 1902 and is named after the physics professor Robert Thalén.
- (Lilly and Sven) Thureus prize was instituted upon a donation from Lilly and Sven Thureus in 1971: originally it was a single prize, but at present it is awarded yearly upon decision by each one of the four classes of the academy.
- Benzeliusbelöningarna (Benzelius grants) is awarded yearly, named after Erik Benzelius the younger, instituted in 1980 and entirely founded by the academy: it is meant as a grant to young researchers.
