= Fourier integral operator =

Class of differential and integral operators

In mathematical analysis, Fourier integral operators have become an important tool in the theory of partial differential equations. The class of Fourier integral operators contains differential operators as well as classical integral operators as special cases.

A Fourier integral operator $T$ is given by:

$$(Tf)(x)=\int_{\mathbb{R}^n} e^{2\pi i \Phi(x,\xi)}a(x,\xi)\hat{f}(\xi) \, d\xi$$

where $\hat f$ denotes the Fourier transform of $f$, $a(x,\xi)$ is a standard symbol which is compactly supported in $x$ and $\Phi$ is real valued and homogeneous of degree $1$ in $\xi$. It is also necessary to require that $\det \left(\frac{\partial^2 \Phi}{\partial x_i \, \partial \xi_j}\right)\neq 0$ on the support of a. Under these conditions, if a is of order zero, it is possible to show that $T$ defines a bounded operator from $L^{2}$ to $L^{2}$.

== Examples ==
One motivation for the study of Fourier integral operators is the solution operator for the initial value problem for the wave operator. Indeed, consider the following problem:

$$\frac{1}{c^2}\frac{\partial^2 u}{\partial t^2}(t,x) = \Delta u(t,x) \quad \mathrm{for} \quad (t,x) \in \mathbb{R}^+ \times \mathbb{R}^n,$$

and

$u(0,x) = 0, \quad \frac{\partial u}{\partial t}(0,x) = f(x), \quad \mathrm{for} \quad f \in \mathcal{S}'(\mathbb{R}^n),$ where $\mathcal{S}(\mathbb{R}^n) \doteq \left\{f\in C^{\infty}(\mathbb{R}^n) \;\bigg|\; \sup_{x\in\mathbb{R}^n} |x^a\partial^b f(x)| < +\infty \;\;\forall\;a,b\;\text{multi-indices} \right\}$ is the space of Schwartz function and $\mathcal{S}'(\mathbb{R}^n)'$ is its strong topological dual.

The formal solution to this problem is given by

$$u(t,x) = \frac{1}{(2 \pi)^n} \int \frac{e^{i (\langle x,\xi \rangle + c t | \xi |)}}{2 i c |\xi |} \hat f (\xi) \, d \xi - \frac{1}{(2 \pi)^n} \int \frac{e^{i (\langle x,\xi \rangle - c t | \xi |)}}{2 i c |\xi |} \hat f (\xi) \, d \xi .$$

These need to be interpreted as oscillatory integrals since they do not in general converge. This formally looks like a sum of two Fourier integral operators, however the coefficients in each of the integrals are not smooth at the origin, and so not standard symbols. If we cut out this singularity with a cutoff function, then the so obtained operators still provide solutions to the initial value problem modulo smooth functions. Thus, if we are only interested in the propagation of singularities of the initial data, it is sufficient to consider such operators. In fact, if we allow the sound speed c in the wave equation to vary with position we can still find a Fourier integral operator that provides a solution modulo smooth functions, and Fourier integral operators thus provide a useful tool for studying the propagation of singularities of solutions to variable speed wave equations, and more generally for other hyperbolic equations.

== See also ==
- Microlocal analysis
- Fourier transform
- Pseudodifferential operator
- Oscillatory integral operator
- Symplectic category
