= Russian Mathematical Surveys =

Uspekhi Matematicheskikh Nauk
- Discipline: Mathematics
- Language: Russian

Publication details
- History: 1936–present
- Publisher: Russian Academy of Sciences

Standard abbreviations
- ISO 4: Uspekhi Mat. Nauk

Indexing
- ISSN: 0042-1316

Links
- Journal homepage

Russian Mathematical Surveys
- Discipline: Mathematics
- Language: English

Publication details
- History: 1960–present
- Publisher: London Mathematical Society/Turpion Ltd/Russian Academy of Sciences

Standard abbreviations
- ISO 4: Russ. Math. Surv.
- MathSciNet: Russian Math. Surveys

Indexing
- ISSN: 0036-0279 (print); 1468-4829 (web)

Links
- @IOP Science; @Turpion

Uspekhi Matematicheskikh Nauk (Russian: Успехи математических наук) is a Russian mathematical journal, published by the Russian Academy of Sciences and Moscow Mathematical Society and translated into English as Russian Mathematical Surveys.

Uspekhi Matematicheskikh Nauk was founded in 1936, with Lazar Lyusternik as its editor-in-chief. Initially, it appeared irregularly, with issues devoted to specific topics within mathematics together with non-research articles about the work of different mathematical institutes in Russia and abroad. Its third issue, in 1937, was devoted to attacks on Nikolai Luzin, but in an anniversary issue 24 years later this politicization of the journal was downplayed. After a hiatus for World War II, the journal began publishing on a regular schedule in 1946.

Its translation, Russian Mathematical Surveys, began in 1960 and since 1997 has been published jointly by the London Mathematical Society, Turpion Ltd, and the Russian Academy of Sciences. Archives of the Russian originals are available online through the All-Russian Mathematical Portal.

Uspekhi Matematicheskikh Nauk successfully overcame the economic difficulties of the 90s and today it is an active publication - one of the leading mathematical journals in the world. Since 1988 its editorial board is headed by S. P. Novikov (born in 1938).

According to the Journal Citation Reports, its 2018 impact factor is 2.038

The journal is indexed in Russian Science Citation Index.
