= Proceedings of the USSR Academy of Sciences =

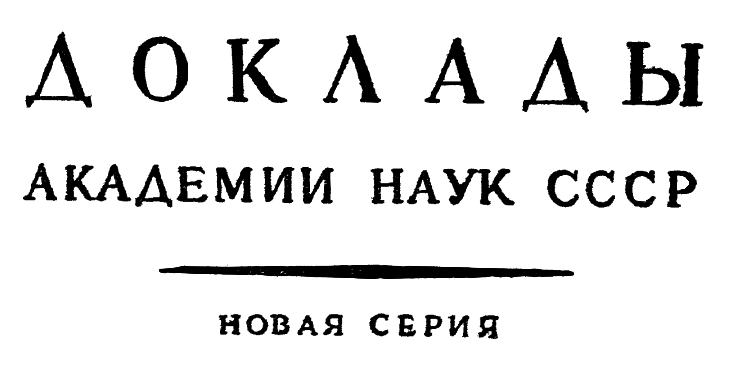
- Language: Russian

Publication details
- History: 1933–1992

Standard abbreviations
- ISO 4: Proc. USSR Acad. Sci.

Indexing
- ISSN: 0002-3264

The Proceedings of the USSR Academy of Sciences (Russian: Доклады Академии Наук СССР, Doklady Akademii Nauk SSSR (DAN SSSR), French: Comptes Rendus de l'Académie des Sciences de l'URSS [kɔ̃t ʁɑ̃dy də lakademi de sjɑ̃s də ly.ɛʁ.ɛs.ɛs]) was a Soviet journal that was dedicated to publishing original, academic research papers in physics, mathematics, chemistry, geology, and biology. It was first published in 1933 and ended in 1992 with volume 322, issue 3.

Today, it is continued by Doklady Akademii Nauk (Russian: Доклады Академии Наук), which began publication in 1992. The journal is also known as the Proceedings of the Russian Academy of Sciences (RAS).

Doklady has had a complicated publication and translation history. A number of translation journals exist which publish selected articles from the original by subject section; these are listed below.

The journal is indexed in Russian Science Citation Index.

== History ==
The Russian Academy of Sciences dates from 1724, with a continuous series of variously named publications dating from 1726.

Doklady Akademii Nauk SSSR-Comptes Rendus de l'Académie des Sciences de l'URSS, Seriya A first appeared in 1925 publishing original, academic research papers in the sciences, mathematics and technology in Russian or very occasionally in English, French or German.

Novaia Seriya replaced Seriya A in 1933, with articles published in Russian and immediately followed by a translation into English, French, or German.

In 1935, with v.3(8), Comptes Rendus de l'Académie des Sciences de l'URSS was split off as a separate journal that continued publishing corresponding Doklady translations until 1947, when it ceased publication. The change in volume numbering with 1935, v.3(8) virtually renumbered: 1933; 1934, v.1-4; and 1935, v.1-2, to: v. 1, 1933; v.2-5, 1934; and v.6-7, 1935.

Doklady Akademii Nauk SSSR continued publication until 1992, when it changed title to Doklady Akademii Nauk.

Some Comptes Rendus (Doklady)... articles also appear to have been published in European journals, and Reaxys/Beilstein and Berichte der Deutschen Chemischen Gesellschaft (Chemische Berichte), Web of Science, Chemical Abstracts (SciFinder) and "Doklady" all use different transliteration schemes. An excellent review of the multiplicity of national/international transliteration schemes is given by Hoseh.

=== Indexing problems ===
SciFinder incorrectly assigned Doklady Akademii Nauk SSSR, Seriya A to articles published between 1933 and 1935, v.2 in Doklady Akademii Nauk SSSR and to articles published between 1935, v.3(8) to v.56(2), 1947 in Comptes Rendus de l'Académie des Sciences de l'URSS. The print Chemical Abstracts provides the correct journal title. Scifinder records for articles published in 1935, v.3(8), 1935 are inconsistently shown as either v.3 or v.8. SciFinder records also do not consistently provide both the Russian and English, French or German pagination for the 1933–1935, v.2 articles.

Web of Science adds a further complication by incorrectly omitting (Doklady) from the journal title, while Reaxys/Beilstein incorrectly gives Chemische Berichte as the journal title for articles appearing in Berichte der Deutschen Chemischen Gesellschaft.

Records in SciFinder and INSPEC for articles published in 1933; 1934, v.1-4; and 1935, v.1-2, are shown in Web of Science as v.1, 1933 – v.7, 1935, because the Web of Science records were indexed for the Century of Science from library volumes that had been subsequently renumbered by the cooperating library.

== Translations ==
English translations of "Doklady" articles began again in 1956, when the American Institute of Physics began publishing Soviet Physics - Doklady. Other publications soon followed and within a few years most Doklady subject sections were available in English translation.

Doklady translation journals are as of 2013 published by Pleiades Publishing, Ltd and distributed online by Springer Science+Business Media. The online translation journals now only publish "selected" articles from the original Russian-language journal, which is also available online from 2006.

Determining the appropriate English translation journal for articles published in ‘Doklady’ is often problematic.

One approach is to check the Russian Doklady issue contents page to identify the subject section and then determine in which translation journal the article was published. The translation journal's contents pages will provide a concordance linking the ‘Doklady’ page numbers with the ‘translation journal’ page numbers.

Another approach is to search SciFinder for the original article, which may show the Doklady subject section, since Chemical Abstracts only indexed the original Russian language articles until 1995.

=== Translation journal titles and their Doklady subject sections ===
Several journals of translations exist, each containing articles that pertain to a particular subject.

==== Doklady Biochemistry (Biochemistry) ====
Incorporated into Doklady Biochemistry & Biophysics.

==== Doklady Biochemistry and Biophysics ====
(Biochemistry, Biophysics, Molecular Biology. Incorporating Doklady Biochemistry and Doklady Biophysics.

==== Doklady. Botanical Sciences Sections ====
Its first issue, Jan/Jun 1964, through to the June 1965 issue was called Proceedings of the Academy of Sciences of the USSR. Botanical Sciences Sections and was published by Consultants Bureau Enterprises. Afterward it was published by Consultants Bureau as Doklady. Botanical Sciences Sections (ISSN 0012-4982).

Note that volumes 142-153 (1962–1963) were also called Doklady. Biological Sciences Sections.

==== Doklady Chemical Technology ====
Chemical Technology. From 2001 to 2024, it was incorporated into Doklady Chemistry.

==== Doklady Chemistry ====
Covered chemistry and chemical technology. Incorporated Doklady Chemical Technology. In 2024, the Doklady Chemistry stopped publishing translations from Doklady Akademii Nauk and now operates its own, independent policy for attracting authors.

==== Doklady of the Academy of Sciences of the USSR. Earth Sciences Sections ====
This journal, also called Proceedings of the Academy of Sciences of the USSR. Geological Sciences Sections and Proceedings of the Academy of Sciences of the USSR. Geochemistry Sections, was published bimonthly as ISSN 0012-494X. Its first issue, Jan/Feb 1959, through to the July/Aug 1959 issue, was published by Consultants Bureau. The Sept/Oct 1959 to Nov/Dec 1961 issues were published by Consultants Bureau Enterprises. Scripta Technica, Inc then published it from 1962 to 1966. Finally, the American Geological Institute published it from 1967 to 1972.

==== Doklady. Earth Science Sections ====
This was published by the American Geological Institute from 1973 to 1985.

==== Transactions (Doklady) of the USSR Academy of Sciences. Earth Science Sections ====
This journal, published bimonthly as ISSN 0891-5571, was published by Scripta Technica in cooperation with the American Geological Institute and American Geophysical Union from 1986 to 1993.

==== Doklady Earth Sciences ====
Covers geochemistry, geography, geology, geophysics, hydrogeology, lithology, mineralogy, paleontology, petrography, oceanology, soil science.

==== Soviet Mathematics ====
This was published by the American Mathematical Society as ISSN 0038-5573. It contained translations of the mathematics sections of volumes 130-220 (1960-early 1975).

==== Soviet Mathematics - Doklady ====
This was published by the American Mathematical Society as ISSN 0197-6788. It first appeared in 1979 as volume 20, and ceased in 1992 with volume 45, issue 1. The journal contained translations of the mathematics sections of volumes 244–322 of DAN SSSR (1979–end).

==== Doklady Mathematics ====
Covers mathematics.

==== Doklady Physical Chemistry ====
Covered physical chemistry. In 2024, the Doklady Physical Chemistry stopped publishing translations from Doklady Akademii Nauk and now operates its own, independent policy for attracting authors.

==== Doklady Physics ====
Doklady Physics covers aerodynamics, astronomy, astrophysics, cosmology, crystallography, cybernetics and control theory, fluid mechanics, heat engineering, hydraulics, mathematical physics, mechanics, physics, power engineering, technical physics, theory of elasticity.

==== Doklady Soil Science ====
Incorporated into Doklady Earth Sciences.
