= Abstract differential equation =

In mathematics, an abstract differential equation is a differential equation in which the unknown function and its derivatives take values in some generic abstract space (a Hilbert space, a Banach space, etc.). Equations of this kind arise e.g. in the study of partial differential equations: if to one of the variables is given a privileged position (e.g. time, in heat or wave equations) and all the others are put together, an ordinary "differential" equation with respect to the variable which was put in evidence is obtained. Adding boundary conditions can often be translated in terms of considering solutions in some convenient function spaces.

The classical abstract differential equation which is most frequently encountered is the equation

$$\frac{\mathrm{d}u}{\mathrm{d}t}=Au+f$$

where the unknown function $u=u(t)$ belongs to some function space $X$, $0\le t\le T \le \infin$ and $A:X\to X$ is an operator (usually a linear operator) acting on this space. An exhaustive treatment of the homogeneous ($f=0$) case with a constant operator is given by the theory of C_{0}-semigroups. Very often, the study of other abstract differential equations amounts (by e.g. reduction to a set of equations of the first order) to the study of this equation.

The theory of abstract differential equations has been founded by Einar Hille in several papers and in his book Functional Analysis and Semi-Groups. Other main contributors were Kōsaku Yosida, Ralph Phillips, Isao Miyadera, and Selim Grigorievich Krein.

== Abstract Cauchy problem ==
=== Definition ===
Let $A$ and $B$ be two linear operators, with domains $D(A)$ and $D(B)$, acting in a Banach space $X$. A function $u(t):[0,T]\to X$ is said to have strong derivative (or to be Frechet differentiable or simply differentiable) at the point $t_0$ if there exists an element $y\in X$ such that

$$\lim_{h\to 0}\left\|\frac{u(t_0+h)-u(t_0)}{h}-y\right\|=0$$

and its derivative is $u'(t_0)=y$.

A solution of the equation

$$B\frac{\mathrm{d}u}{\mathrm{d}t}=Au$$

is a function $u(t):[0,\infty)\to D(A)\cap D(B)$ such that:

- $(Bu)(t)\in C([0,\infty);X),$
- the strong derivative $u'(t)$ exists $\forall t \in [0,\infty)$ and $u'(t)\in D(B)$ for any such $t$, and
- the previous equality holds $\forall t \in [0,\infty)$.

The Cauchy problem consists in finding a solution of the equation, satisfying the initial condition $u(0)=u_0 \in D(A)\cap D(B)$.

=== Well posedness ===
According to the definition of well-posed problem by Hadamard, the Cauchy problem is said to be well posed (or correct) on $[0,\infty)$ if:

- for any $u_0 \in D(A)\cap D(B)$ it has a unique solution, and
- this solution depends continuously on the initial data in the sense that if $u_n(0)\to 0$ ($u_n(0)\in D(A)\cap D(B)$), then $u_n(t)\to 0$ for the corresponding solution at every $t \in [0,\infty).$

A well posed Cauchy problem is said to be uniformly well posed if $u_n(0)\to 0$ implies $u_n(t)\to 0$ uniformly in $t$ on each finite interval $[0,T]$.

=== Semigroup of operators associated to a Cauchy problem ===
To an abstract Cauchy problem one can associate a semigroup of operators $U(t)$, i.e. a family of bounded linear operators depending on a parameter $t$ ($0<t<\infty$) such that

$$U(t_1+t_2)=U(t_1)U(t_2)\quad (0<t_1,t_2<\infty).$$

Consider the operator $U(t)$ which assigns to the element $u_n(0)\in D(A)\cap D(B)$ the value of the solution $u(t)$ of the Cauchy problem ($u(0)=u_0$) at the moment of time $t>0$. If the Cauchy problem is well posed, then the operator $U(t)$ is defined on $D(A)\cap D(B)$ and forms a semigroup.

Additionally, if $D(A)\cap D(B)$ is dense in $X$, the operator $U(t)$ can be extended to a bounded linear operator defined on the entire space $X$. In this case one can associate to any $x_0\in X$ the function $U(t)x_0$, for any $t>0$. Such a function is called generalized solution of the Cauchy problem.

If $D(A)\cap D(B)$ is dense in $X$ and the Cauchy problem is uniformly well posed, then the associated semigroup $U(t)$ is a C_{0}-semigroup in $X$.

Conversely, if $A$ is the infinitesimal generator of a C_{0}-semigroup $U(t)$, then the Cauchy problem

$$\frac{\mathrm{d}u}{\mathrm{d}t}=Au\quad u(0)=u_0 \in D(A)$$

is uniformly well posed and the solution is given by

$$u(t)=U(t)u_0.$$

== Nonhomogeneous problem ==
The Cauchy problem

$$\frac{\mathrm{d}u}{\mathrm{d}t}=Au+f \quad u(0)=u_0\in D(A)$$

with $f:[0,\infty)\to X$, is called nonhomogeneous when $f(t)\neq 0$. The following theorem gives some sufficient conditions for the existence of the solution:

Theorem. If $A$ is an infinitesimal generator of a C_{0}-semigroup $T(t)$ and $f$ is continuously differentiable, then the function

$$u(t)=T(t)u_0+\int_0^t T(t-s)f(s) \, ds,\quad t\geq 0$$

is the unique solution to the (abstract) nonhomogeneous Cauchy problem.

The integral on the right-hand side as to be intended as a Bochner integral.

== Time-dependent problem ==
The problem of finding a solution to the initial value problem

$$\frac{\mathrm{d}u}{\mathrm{d}t}=A(t)u+f \quad u(0)=u_0\in D(A),$$

where the unknown is a function $u:[0,T]\to X$, $f:[0,T]\to X$ is given and, for each $t\in [0,T]$, $A(t)$ is a given, closed, linear operator in $X$ with domain $D[A(t)]=D$, independent of $t$ and dense in $X$, is called time-dependent Cauchy problem.

An operator valued function $U(t,\tau)$ with values in $B(X)$ (the space of all bounded linear operators from $X$ to $X$), defined and strongly continuous jointly in $t,\tau$ for $0\leq \tau\leq t\leq T$, is called a fundamental solution of the time-dependent problem if:

- the partial derivative $\frac{\mathrm{\delta}U(t,\tau)}{\mathrm{\delta}t}$ exists in the strong topology of $X$, belongs to $B(X)$ for $0\leq \tau\leq t\leq T$, and is strongly continuous in $t$ for $0\leq \tau\leq t\leq T$;
- the range of $U(t,\tau)$ is in $D$;
- $\frac{\mathrm{\delta}U(t,\tau)}{\mathrm{\delta}t}+A(t)U(t,\tau)=0, \quad 0\leq \tau\leq t\leq T,$ and
- $U(\tau,\tau)=I$.

$U(\tau,\tau)$ is also called evolution operator, propagator, solution operator or Green's function.

A function $u:[0,T]\to X$ is called a mild solution of the time-dependent problem if it admits the integral representation

$$u(t)=U(t,0)u_0+\int_0^t U(t,s)f(s)\,ds,\quad t\geq 0.$$

There are various known sufficient conditions for the existence of the evolution operator $U(t,\tau)$. In practically all cases considered in the literature $-A(t)$ is assumed to be the infinitesimal generator of a C_{0}-semigroup on $X$. Roughly speaking, if $-A(t)$ is the infinitesimal generator of a contraction semigroup the equation is said to be of hyperbolic type; if $-A(t)$ is the infinitesimal generator of an analytic semigroup the equation is said to be of parabolic type.

== Non linear problem ==
The problem of finding a solution to either

$$\frac{\mathrm{d}u}{\mathrm{d}t}=f(t,u) \quad u(0)=u_0\in X$$

where $f:[0,T]\times X\to X$ is given, or

$$\frac{\mathrm{d}u}{\mathrm{d}t}=A(t)u \quad u(0)=u_0\in D(A)$$

where $A$ is a nonlinear operator with domain $D(A)\in X$, is called nonlinear Cauchy problem.

== See also ==
- Cauchy problem
- C0-semigroup
