= Stone's theorem on one-parameter unitary groups =

Theorem relating unitary operators to one-parameter Lie groups

In mathematics, Stone's theorem on one-parameter unitary groups is a basic theorem of functional analysis that establishes a one-to-one correspondence between self-adjoint operators on a Hilbert space $\mathcal{H}$ and one-parameter families

$$(U_{t})_{t \in \R}$$

of unitary operators that are strongly continuous, i.e.,

$$\forall t_0 \in \R, \psi \in \mathcal{H}: \qquad \lim_{t \to t_0} U_t(\psi) = U_{t_0}(\psi),$$

and are homomorphisms, i.e.,

$$\forall s,t \in \R : \qquad U_{t + s} = U_t U_s.$$

Such one-parameter families are ordinarily referred to as strongly continuous one-parameter unitary groups.

The theorem was proved by Marshall Stone (1930, 1932), and John von Neumann (1932) showed that the requirement that $(U_t)_{t \in \R}$ be strongly continuous can be relaxed to say that it is merely weakly measurable, at least when the Hilbert space is separable.

This is an impressive result, as it allows one to define the derivative of the mapping $t \mapsto U_t,$ which is only supposed to be continuous. It is also related to the theory of Lie groups and Lie algebras.

== Formal statement ==
The statement of the theorem is as follows.

Theorem. Let $(U_t)_{t \in \R}$ be a strongly continuous one-parameter unitary group. Then there exists a unique (possibly unbounded) operator $A: \mathcal{D}_A \to \mathcal{H}$, that is self-adjoint on $\mathcal{D}_A$ and such that

$$\forall t \in \R : \qquad U_t = e^{itA}.$$

The domain of $A$ is defined by

$$\mathcal{D}_A = \left \{ \psi \in \mathcal{H} \left | \lim_{\varepsilon \to 0} \frac{-i}{\varepsilon} \left(U_{\varepsilon} (\psi) - \psi \right) \text{ exists} \right. \right \}.$$

Conversely, let $A: \mathcal{D}_A \to \mathcal{H}$ be a (possibly unbounded) self-adjoint operator on $\mathcal{D}_A \subseteq \mathcal{H}.$ Then the one-parameter family $(U_{t})_{t \in \R}$ of unitary operators defined by

$$\forall t \in \R : \qquad U_{t} := e^{itA}$$

is a strongly continuous one-parameter group.

In both parts of the theorem, the expression $e^{itA}$ is defined by means of the functional calculus, which uses the spectral theorem for unbounded self-adjoint operators.

The operator $A$ is called the infinitesimal generator of $(U_{t})_{t \in \R}.$ Furthermore, $A$ will be a bounded operator if and only if the operator-valued mapping $t \mapsto U_{t}$ is norm-continuous.

The infinitesimal generator $A$ of a strongly continuous unitary group $(U_{t})_{t \in \R}$ may be computed as

$$A\psi = -i\lim_{\varepsilon\to 0}\frac{U_\varepsilon\psi-\psi}{\varepsilon},$$

with the domain of $A$ consisting of those vectors $\psi$ for which the limit exists in the norm topology. That is to say, $A$ is equal to $-i$ times the derivative of $U_t$ with respect to $t$ at $t=0$. Part of the statement of the theorem is that this derivative exists—i.e., that $A$ is a densely defined self-adjoint operator. The result is not obvious even in the finite-dimensional case, since $U_t$ is only assumed (ahead of time) to be continuous, and not differentiable.

== Example ==
The family of translation operators

$$\left[ T_t(\psi) \right](x) = \psi(x + t)$$

is a one-parameter unitary group of unitary operators; the infinitesimal generator of this family is an extension of the differential operator

$$-i \frac{d}{dx}$$

defined on the space of continuously differentiable complex-valued functions with compact support on $\R.$ Thus

$$T_{t} = e^{t \frac{d}{dx}}.$$

In other words, motion on the line is generated by the momentum operator.

== Applications ==
Stone's theorem has numerous applications in quantum mechanics. For instance, given an isolated quantum mechanical system, with Hilbert space of states H, time evolution is a strongly continuous one-parameter unitary group on $\mathcal{H}$. The infinitesimal generator of this group is the system Hamiltonian.

== Using Fourier transform ==
Stone's Theorem can be recast using the language of the Fourier transform. The real line $\R$ is a locally compact abelian group. Non-degenerate *-representations of the group C*-algebra $C^*(\R)$ are in one-to-one correspondence with strongly continuous unitary representations of $\R,$ i.e., strongly continuous one-parameter unitary groups. On the other hand, the Fourier transform is a *-isomorphism from $C^*(\R)$ to $C_0(\R),$ the $C^*$-algebra of continuous complex-valued functions on the real line that vanish at infinity. Hence, there is a one-to-one correspondence between strongly continuous one-parameter unitary groups and *-representations of $C_0(\R).$ As every *-representation of $C_0(\R)$ corresponds uniquely to a self-adjoint operator, Stone's Theorem holds.

Therefore, the procedure for obtaining the infinitesimal generator of a strongly continuous one-parameter unitary group is as follows:

- Let $(U_{t})_{t \in \R}$ be a strongly continuous unitary representation of $\R$ on a Hilbert space $\mathcal{H}$.
- Integrate this unitary representation to yield a non-degenerate *-representation $\rho$ of $C^*(\R)$ on $\mathcal{H}$ by first defining
  $$\forall f \in C_c(\R): \quad \rho(f) := \int_{\R} f(t) ~ U_{t} dt,$$
  and then extending $\rho$ to all of $C^*(\R)$ by continuity.
- Use the Fourier transform to obtain a non-degenerate *-representation $\tau$ of $C_0(\R )$ on $\mathcal{H}$.
- By the Riesz-Markov Theorem, $\tau$ gives rise to a projection-valued measure on $\R$ that is the resolution of the identity of a unique self-adjoint operator $A$, which may be unbounded.
- Then $A$ is the infinitesimal generator of $(U_{t})_{t \in \R }.$

The precise definition of $C^*(\R)$ is as follows. Consider the *-algebra $C_c(\R),$ the continuous complex-valued functions on $\R$ with compact support, where the multiplication is given by convolution. The completion of this *-algebra with respect to the $L^1$-norm is a Banach *-algebra, denoted by $(L^1(\R),\star).$ Then $C^*(\R)$ is defined to be the enveloping $C^*$-algebra of $(L^1(\R),\star)$, i.e., its completion with respect to the largest possible $C^*$-norm. It is a non-trivial fact that, via the Fourier transform, $C^*(\R)$ is isomorphic to $C_0(\R).$ A result in this direction is the Riemann-Lebesgue Lemma, which says that the Fourier transform maps $L^1(\R)$ to $C_0(\R).$

== Generalizations ==
The Stone–von Neumann theorem generalizes Stone's theorem to a pair of self-adjoint operators, $(P,Q)$, satisfying the canonical commutation relation, and shows that these are all unitarily equivalent to the position operator and momentum operator on $L^2(\R).$

The Hille–Yosida theorem generalizes Stone's theorem to strongly continuous one-parameter semigroups of contractions on Banach spaces.

== Bibliography ==
- Hall, B.C. (2013), Quantum Theory for Mathematicians, Graduate Texts in Mathematics, vol. 267, Springer, Bibcode:2013qtm..book.....H, ISBN 978-1461471158
- von Neumann, John (1932), "Über einen Satz von Herrn M. H. Stone", Annals of Mathematics, Second Series (in German), 33 (3), Annals of Mathematics: 567–573, doi:10.2307/1968535, ISSN 0003-486X, JSTOR 1968535
- Stone, M. H. (1930), "Linear Transformations in Hilbert Space. III. Operational Methods and Group Theory", Proceedings of the National Academy of Sciences of the United States of America, 16 (2), National Academy of Sciences: 172–175, Bibcode:1930PNAS...16..172S, doi:10.1073/pnas.16.2.172, ISSN 0027-8424, JSTOR 85485, PMC 1075964, PMID 16587545
- Stone, M. H. (1932), "On one-parameter unitary groups in Hilbert Space", Annals of Mathematics, 33 (3): 643–648, doi:10.2307/1968538, JSTOR 1968538
- K. Yosida, Functional Analysis, Springer-Verlag, (1968)
