= Landau–Kolmogorov inequality =

Mathematical family of interpolation inequalities

In mathematics, the Landau–Kolmogorov inequality, named after Edmund Landau and Andrey Kolmogorov, is the following family of interpolation inequalities between different derivatives of a function f defined on a subset T of the real numbers:

$$\|f^{(k)}\|_{L_\infty(T)} \le C(n, k, T)  {\|f\|_{L_\infty(T)}}^{1-k/n} {\|f^{(n)}\|_{L_\infty(T)}}^{k/n} \text{ for } 1\le k < n.$$

== On the real line ==
For k = 1, n = 2 and T = [c,∞) or T = R, the inequality was first proved by Edmund Landau with the sharp constants C(2, 1, [c,∞)) = 2 and C(2, 1, R) = √2. Following contributions by Jacques Hadamard and Georgiy Shilov, Andrey Kolmogorov found the sharp constants and arbitrary n, k:

$$C(n, k, \mathbb R) = a_{n-k} a_n^{-1+k/n}~,$$

where a_{n} are the Favard constants.

== On the half-line ==
Following work by Matorin and others, the extremising functions were found by Isaac Jacob Schoenberg, explicit forms for the sharp constants are however still unknown.

== Generalisations ==
There are many generalisations, which are of the form

$$\|f^{(k)}\|_{L_q(T)} \le K \cdot {\|f\|^\alpha_{L_p(T)}} \cdot {\|f^{(n)}\|^{1-\alpha}_{L_r(T)}}\text{ for }1\le k < n.$$

Here all three norms can be different from each other (from L_{1} to L_{∞}, with p=q=r=∞ in the classical case) and T may be the real axis, semiaxis or a closed segment.

The Kallman–Rota inequality generalizes the Landau–Kolmogorov inequalities from the derivative operator to more general contractions on Banach spaces.

== Notes ==
→
