= Brezis–Gallouët inequality =

In mathematical analysis, the Brezis–Gallouët inequality, named after Haïm Brezis and Thierry Gallouët, is an inequality valid in 2 spatial dimensions. It shows that a function of two variables which is sufficiently smooth is (essentially) bounded, and provides an explicit bound, which depends only logarithmically on the second derivatives. It is useful in the study of partial differential equations.

Let $\Omega\subset\mathbb{R}^2$ be the exterior or the interior of a bounded domain with regular boundary, or $\mathbb{R}^2$ itself. Then the Brezis–Gallouët inequality states that there exists a real $C$ only depending on $\Omega$ such that, for all $u\in H^2(\Omega)$ which is not a.e. equal to 0,

$$\displaystyle \|u\|_{L^\infty(\Omega)}\leq C \|u\|_{H^1(\Omega)}\left(1+\Bigl(\log\bigl( 1+\frac{\|u\|_{H^2(\Omega)}}{\|u\|_{H^1(\Omega)}}\bigr)\Bigr)^{1/2}\right).$$

Proof

The regularity hypothesis on $\Omega$ is defined such that there exists an extension operator $P~:~H^2(\Omega)\to H^2(\mathbb{R}^2)$ such that:

- $P$ is a bounded operator from $H^1(\Omega)$ to $H^1(\mathbb{R}^2)$;
- $P$ is a bounded operator from $H^2(\Omega)$ to $H^2(\mathbb{R}^2)$;
- the restriction to $\Omega$ of $P u$ is equal to $u$ for all $u\in H^2(\Omega)$.

Let $u\in H^2(\Omega)$ be such that $\|u\|_{H^1(\Omega)} = 1$. Then, denoting by $\widehat{v}$ the function obtained from $v = P u$ by Fourier transform, one gets the existence of $C>0$ only depending on $\Omega$ such that:

- $\|(1+|\xi|)\widehat{v}\|_{L^2(\mathbb{R}^2)} \le C$,
- $\|(1+|\xi|^2)\widehat{v}\|_{L^2(\mathbb{R}^2)} \le C\|u\|_{H^2(\Omega)}$,
- $\|u\|_{L^\infty(\Omega)} \le \|v\|_{L^\infty(\mathbb{R}^2)} \le C\|\widehat{v}\|_{L^1(\mathbb{R}^2)}$.

For any $R >0$, one writes:

$$\begin{align}\displaystyle \|\widehat{v}\|_{L^1(\mathbb{R}^2)} &= \int_{|\xi|<R} |\widehat{v}(\xi)| {\rm d}\xi + \int_{|\xi|>R} |\widehat{v}(\xi)| {\rm d}\xi\\
&= \int_{|\xi|<R} (1+|\xi|)|\widehat{v}(\xi)| \frac 1 {1+|\xi|}{\rm d}\xi + \int_{|\xi|>R} (1+|\xi|^2)|\widehat{v}(\xi)| \frac 1 {1+|\xi|^2}{\rm d}\xi\\
&\le C \left( \int_{|\xi|<R}  \frac 1 {(1+|\xi|)^2}{\rm d}\xi\right)^{\frac 1 2} + C \|u\|_{H^2(\Omega)}\left(\int_{|\xi|>R} \frac 1 {(1+|\xi|^2)^2}{\rm d}\xi\right)^{\frac 1 2},\end{align}$$

owing to the preceding inequalities and to the Cauchy-Schwarz inequality. This yields

$$\|\widehat{v}\|_{L^1(\mathbb{R}^2)}\le C(\log(1+R))^{\frac 1 2} +  C \frac {\|u\|_{H^2(\Omega)}} {1+R}.$$

The inequality is then proven, in the case $\|u\|_{H^1(\Omega)} = 1$, by letting $R =\|u\|_{H^2(\Omega)}$. For the general case of $u\in H^2(\Omega)$ non identically null, it suffices to apply this inequality to the function $u/ \|u\|_{H^1(\Omega)}$.

Noticing that, for any $v\in H^2(\mathbb{R}^2)$, there holds

$$\int_{\mathbb{R}^2} \bigl( (\partial^2_{11} v)^2 + 2(\partial^2_{12} v)^2 +  (\partial^2_{22} v)^2\bigr) = \int_{\mathbb{R}^2} \bigl(\partial^2_{11} v+\partial^2_{22} v\bigr)^2,$$

one deduces from the Brezis-Gallouet inequality that there exists $C>0$ only depending on $\Omega$ such that, for all $u\in H^2(\Omega)$ which is not a.e. equal to 0,

$$\displaystyle \|u\|_{L^\infty(\Omega)}\leq C \|u\|_{H^1(\Omega)}\left(1+\Bigl(\log\bigl( 1+\frac{\|\Delta u\|_{L^2(\Omega)}}{\|u\|_{H^1(\Omega)}}\bigr)\Bigr)^{1/2}\right).$$

The previous inequality is close to the way that the Brezis-Gallouet inequality is cited in.

== See also ==
- Ladyzhenskaya inequality
- Agmon's inequality
