= Dissipative operator =

In mathematics, a dissipative operator is a linear operator A defined on a linear subspace D(A) of Banach space X, taking values in X such that for all λ > 0 and all x ∈ D(A)

$$\|(\lambda I-A)x\|\geq\lambda\|x\|.$$

A couple of equivalent definitions are given below. A dissipative operator is called maximally dissipative if it is dissipative and for all λ > 0 the operator λI − A is surjective, meaning that the range when applied to the domain D is the whole of the space X.

An operator that obeys a similar condition but with a plus sign instead of a minus sign (that is, the negation of a dissipative operator) is called an accretive operator.

The main importance of dissipative operators is their appearance in the Lumer–Phillips theorem which characterizes maximally dissipative operators as the generators of contraction semigroups.

== Properties ==
A dissipative operator has the following properties:

- From the inequality given above, we see that for any x in the domain of A, if ‖x‖ ≠ 0 then $\|(\lambda I-A)x\|\ne 0,$ so the kernel of λI − A is just the zero vector and λI − A is therefore injective and has an inverse for all λ > 0. (If we have the strict inequality $\|(\lambda I-A)x\|>\lambda\|x\|$ for all non-null x in the domain, then, by the triangle inequality, $\|\lambda x\|+\|Ax\|\ge\|(\lambda I-A)x\|>\lambda\|x\|,$ which implies that A itself has an inverse.) We may then state that

$$\|(\lambda I-A)^{-1}z\|\leq\frac{1}{\lambda}\|z\|$$

for all z in the range of λI − A. This is the same inequality as that given at the beginning of this article, with $z=(\lambda I-A)x.$ (We could equally well write these as $\|(I-\kappa A)^{-1}z\|\leq\|z\|\text{ or }\|(I-\kappa A)x\|\geq\|x\|$ which must hold for any positive κ.)

- λI − A is surjective for some λ > 0 if and only if it is surjective for all λ > 0. (This is the aforementioned maximally dissipative case.) In that case one has (0, ∞) ⊂ ρ(A) (the resolvent set of A).
- A is a closed operator if and only if the range of λI - A is closed for some (equivalently: for all) λ > 0.

== Equivalent characterizations ==
Define the duality set of x ∈ X, a subset of the dual space X' of X, by

$$J(x):=\left\{x'\in X':\|x'\|_{X'}^2=\|x\|_{X}^2=\langle x',x\rangle \right\}.$$

By the Hahn–Banach theorem this set is nonempty. In the Hilbert space case (using the canonical duality between a Hilbert space and its dual) it consists of the single element x. More generally, if X is a Banach space with a strictly convex dual, then J(x) consists of a single element. Using this notation, A is dissipative if and only if for all x ∈ D(A) there exists a x' ∈ J(x) such that

$${\rm Re}\langle Ax,x'\rangle\leq0.$$

In the case of Hilbert spaces, this becomes ${\rm Re}\langle Ax,x\rangle\leq0$ for all x in D(A). Since this is non-positive, we have

$$\|x-Ax\|^2=\|x\|^2+\|Ax\|^2-2{\rm Re}\langle Ax,x\rangle\geq\|x\|^2+\|Ax\|^2+2{\rm Re}\langle Ax,x\rangle=\|x+Ax\|^2$$

$$\therefore\|x-Ax\|\geq\|x+Ax\|$$

Since I−A has an inverse, this implies that $(I+A)(I-A)^{-1}$ is a contraction, and more generally, $(\lambda I+A)(\lambda I-A)^{-1}$ is a contraction for any positive λ. The utility of this formulation is that if this operator is a contraction for some positive λ then A is dissipative. It is not necessary to show that it is a contraction for all positive λ (though this is true), in contrast to (λI−A)^{−1} which must be proved to be a contraction for all positive values of λ.

== Examples ==
- For a simple finite-dimensional example, consider n-dimensional Euclidean space R^{n} with its usual dot product. If A denotes the negative of the identity operator, defined on all of R^{n}, then

$$x \cdot A x = x \cdot (-x) = - \| x \|^{2} \leq 0,$$

so A is a dissipative operator.

- So long as the domain of an operator A (a matrix) is the whole Euclidean space, then it is dissipative if and only if A+A^{*} (the sum of A and its adjoint) does not have any positive eigenvalue, and (consequently) all such operators are maximally dissipative. This criterion follows from the fact that the real part of $x^{*}Ax,$ which must be nonpositive for any x, is $x^{*}\frac{A+A^{*}}2x.$ The eigenvalues of this quadratic form must therefore be nonpositive. (The fact that the real part of $x^{*}Ax,$ must be nonpositive implies that the real parts of the eigenvalues of A must be nonpositive, but this is not sufficient. For example, if
  $$A=\begin{pmatrix}-1 & 3 \\0 & -1\end{pmatrix}$$
  then its eigenvalues are negative, but the eigenvalues of A+A^{*} are −5 and 1, so A is not dissipative.) An equivalent condition is that for some (and hence any) positive $\lambda, \lambda-A$ has an inverse and the operator $(\lambda+A)(\lambda-A)^{-1}$ is a contraction (that is, it either diminishes or leaves unchanged the norm of its operand). If the time derivative of a point x in the space is given by Ax, then the time evolution is governed by a contraction semigroup that constantly decreases the norm (or at least doesn't allow it to increase). (Note however that if the domain of A is a proper subspace, then A cannot be maximally dissipative because the range will not have a high enough dimensionality.)
- Consider H = L^{2}([0, 1]; R) with its usual inner product, and let Au = u′ (in this case a weak derivative) with domain D(A) equal to those functions u in the Sobolev space $H^1([0,\;1];\;\mathbf{R})$ with u(1) = 0. D(A) is dense in L^{2}([0, 1]; R). Moreover, for every u in D(A), using integration by parts,

$$\langle u, A u \rangle = \int_{0}^{1} u(x) u'(x) \, \mathrm{d} x = - \frac1{2} u(0)^{2} \leq 0.$$

Hence, A is a dissipative operator. Furthermore, since there is a solution (almost everywhere) in D to $u-\lambda u'=f$ for any f in H, the operator A is maximally dissipative. Note that in a case of infinite dimensionality like this, the range can be the whole Banach space even though the domain is only a proper subspace thereof.

- Consider H = H_{0}^{2}(Ω; R) (see Sobolev space) for an open and connected domain Ω ⊆ R^{n} and let A = Δ, the Laplace operator, defined on the dense subspace of compactly supported smooth functions on Ω. Then, using integration by parts,

$$\langle u, \Delta u \rangle = \int_\Omega u(x) \Delta u(x) \, \mathrm{d} x = - \int_\Omega \big| \nabla u(x) \big|^{2} \, \mathrm{d} x = - \| \nabla u \|^2_{L^{2} (\Omega; \mathbf{R})} \leq 0,$$

so the Laplacian is a dissipative operator.
