= Gagliardo–Nirenberg interpolation inequality =

Theorem in mathematical analysis

In mathematics, and in particular in mathematical analysis, the Gagliardo–Nirenberg interpolation inequality is a result in the theory of Sobolev spaces that relates the $L^p$-norms of different weak derivatives of a function through an interpolation inequality. The theorem is of particular importance in the framework of elliptic partial differential equations and was originally formulated by Emilio Gagliardo and Louis Nirenberg in 1958. The Gagliardo-Nirenberg inequality has found numerous applications in the investigation of nonlinear partial differential equations, and has been generalized to fractional Sobolev spaces by Haïm Brezis and Petru Mironescu in the late 2010s.

== History ==
The Gagliardo-Nirenberg inequality was originally proposed by Emilio Gagliardo and Louis Nirenberg in two independent contributions during the International Congress of Mathematicians held in Edinburgh from August 14, 1958, through August 21, 1958. In the following year, both authors improved their results and published them independently. Nonetheless, a complete proof of the inequality went missing in the literature for a long time. Indeed, to some extent, both original works of Gagliardo and Nirenberg do not contain a full and rigorous argument proving the result. For example, Nirenberg firstly included the inequality in a collection of lectures given in Pisa from September 1 to September 10, 1958. The transcription of the lectures was later published in 1959, and the author explicitly states only the main steps of the proof. On the other hand, the proof of Gagliardo did not yield the result in full generality, i.e. for all possible values of the parameters appearing in the statement. Detailed proof in the whole Euclidean space were published in 2017 and in 2021.

From its original formulation, several mathematicians worked on proving and generalizing Gagliardo-Nirenberg type inequalities. The Italian mathematician Carlo Miranda developed a first generalization in 1963, which was addressed and refined by Nirenberg later in 1966. The investigation of Gagliardo-Nirenberg type inequalities continued in the following decades. For instance, a careful study on negative exponents has been carried out extending the work of Nirenberg in 2018, while Brezis and Mironescu characterized in full generality the embeddings between Sobolev spaces extending the inequality to fractional orders.

== Statement of the inequality ==
For any extended real (i.e. possibly infinite) positive quantity $1 \leq p \leq +\infty$ and any integer $k \geq 1$, let $L^p(\mathbb{R}^n)$ denote the usual $L^p$ spaces, while $W^{k,p}(\mathbb{R}^n)$ denotes the Sobolev space consisting of all real-valued functions in $L^p(\mathbb{R}^n)$ such that all their weak derivatives up to order $k$ are also in $L^p(\mathbb{R}^n)$. Both families of spaces are intended to be endowed with their standard norms, namely:
$$\| u \|_{L^p(\mathbb{R}^n)} :=
\begin{cases}
\left( \displaystyle\int_{\mathbb{R}^n} |u|^p \right)^\frac{1}{p} & \quad \text{if } p < +\infty, \\
\underset{\mathbb{R}^n}{\operatorname{ess\,sup}} \,|u| & \quad \text{if } p = +\infty;
\end{cases}
\qquad \qquad
\|u\|_{W^{k,p}(\mathbb{R}^n)} := \begin{cases}
\left(\displaystyle\sum_{|\alpha| \leq k} \|D^\alpha u\|_{L^p(\mathbb{R}^n)}^p\right)^\frac{1}{p} & \quad \text{if } p < +\infty, \\
\ \ \ \displaystyle\sum_{|\alpha| \leq k} \|D^\alpha u\|_{L^\infty(\mathbb{R}^n)} & \quad \text{if } p = +\infty;
\end{cases}$$
where $\operatorname{ess\,sup}$ stands for essential supremum. Above, for the sake of convenience, the same notation is used for scalar, vector and tensor-valued Lebesgue and Sobolev spaces.

The original version of the theorem, for functions defined on the whole Euclidean space $\mathbb{R}^n$, can be stated as follows.

Theorem (Gagliardo-Nirenberg)—Let $1 \leq q \leq +\infty$ be a positive extended real quantity. Let $j$ and $m$ be non-negative integers such that $j < m$. Furthermore, let $1 \leq r \leq +\infty$ be a positive extended real quantity, $p \geq 1$ be real and $\theta \in [0,1]$ such that the relations
$$\dfrac{1}{p} = \dfrac{j}{n} + \theta \left( \dfrac{1}{r} - \dfrac{m}{n} \right) + \dfrac{1-\theta}{q}, \qquad \dfrac jm \leq \theta \leq 1$$
hold. Then,
$$\|D^j u\|_{L^p(\mathbb{R}^n)} \leq C\|D^m u\|_{L^r(\mathbb{R}^n)}^\theta\|u\|_{L^q(\mathbb{R}^n)}^{1-\theta}$$
for any $u \in L^q(\mathbb{R}^n)$ such that $D^m u \in L^r(\mathbb{R}^n)$, with two exceptional cases:

1. if $j = 0$ (with the understanding that $D^0 u = u$), $q = +\infty$ and $rm < n$, then an additional assumption is needed: either $u$ tends to 0 at infinity, or $u \in L^s(\mathbb{R}^n)$ for some finite value of $s$;
2. if $r > 1$ and $m - j - \frac{n}{r}$ is a non-negative integer, then the additional assumption $\frac{j}{m}\leq\theta< 1$ (notice the strict inequality) is needed.

In any case, the constant $C > 0$ depends on the parameters $j,\,m,\,n,\,q,\,r,\,\theta$, but not on $u$.

Notice that the parameter $p$ is determined uniquely by all the other ones and usually assumed to be finite. However, there are sharper formulations in which $p = +\infty$ is considered (but other values may be excluded, for example $j = 0$).

== Relevant corollaries of the Gagliardo-Nirenberg inequality ==
The Gagliardo-Nirenberg inequality generalizes a collection of well-known results in the field of functional analysis. Indeed, given a suitable choice of the seven parameters appearing in the statement of the theorem, one obtains several useful and recurring inequalities in the theory of partial differential equations:

- The Sobolev embedding theorem establishes the existence of continuous embeddings between Sobolev spaces with different orders of differentiation and/or integrability. It can be obtained from the Gagliardo-Nirenberg inequality setting $\theta = 1$ (so that the choice of $q$ becomes irrelevant, and the same goes for the associated requirement $u \in L^q(\mathbb{R}^n)$) and the remaining parameters in such a way that
  $$\dfrac 1p - \dfrac jn = \dfrac 1r - \dfrac mn$$
  and the other hypotheses are satisfied. The result reads then
  $$\|D^j u\|_{L^p(\mathbb{R}^n)} \leq C \|D^m u\|_{L^r(\mathbb{R}^n)}$$
  for any $u$ such that $D^m u \in L^r(\mathbb{R}^n)$. In particular, setting $j = 0$ and $m = 1$ yields that $p = r^*$, namely the Sobolev conjugate exponent of $r$, and we have the embedding
  $$W^{1,r}(\mathbb{R}^n) \hookrightarrow L^{r^*}(\mathbb{R}^n).$$
  Notice that, in the embedding above, we also implicitly assume that $u \in L^r(\mathbb{R}^n)$ and hence the first exceptional case does not apply.
- The Ladyzhenskaya inequality is a special case of the Gagliardo-Nirenberg inequality. Considering the most common cases, namely $n = 2$ and $n = 3$, we have the former corresponding to the parameter choice
  $$j = 0, \quad m = 1, \quad p = 4, \quad q = r = 2, \quad \theta = \frac 12,$$
  yielding
  $$\|u\|_{L^4(\mathbb{R}^2)} \leq C\|u\|_{L^2(\mathbb{R}^2)}^\frac 12\|\nabla u\|_{L^2(\mathbb{R}^2)}^\frac 12$$
  for any $u \in W^{1,2}(\mathbb{R}^2).$ The constant $C$ is universal and a possible (not sharp) value can be proven to be $\sqrt{2}$. In three space dimensions, a slightly different choice of parameters is needed, namely
  $$j = 0, \quad m = 1, \quad p = 4, \quad q = r = 2, \quad \theta = \frac 34,$$
  yielding
  $$\|u\|_{L^4(\mathbb{R}^3)} \leq C\|u\|_{L^2(\mathbb{R}^3)}^\frac 14\|\nabla u\|_{L^2(\mathbb{R}^3)}^\frac 34$$
  for any $u \in W^{1,2}(\mathbb{R}^3)$. Here, it holds $C = \left( \frac{4\sqrt 3}{9}\right)^\frac 34$.
- The Nash inequality, which was published by John Nash in 1958, is yet another result generalized by the Gagliardo-Nirenberg inequality. Indeed, choosing
  $$j = 0, \quad m = 1, \quad n \geq 1,\quad p = 2, \quad q = 1, \quad r = 2, \quad \theta = \frac{n}{n+2},$$
  one gets
  $$\|u\|_{L^2(\mathbb{R}^n)} \leq C \|u\|_{L^1(\mathbb{R}^n)}^{\frac{2}{n+2}}\|\nabla u\|_{L^2(\mathbb{R}^n)}^{\frac{n}{n+2}}$$
  which is oftentimes recast as
  $$\|u\|_{L^2(\mathbb{R}^n)}^{1+\frac 2n} \leq C \|u\|_{L^1(\mathbb{R}^n)}^{\frac{2}{n}}\|\nabla u\|_{L^2(\mathbb{R}^n)}$$
  or its squared version.

== Proof of the Gagliardo-Nirenberg inequality ==
A complete and detailed proof of the Gagliardo-Nirenberg inequality has been missing in literature for a long time since its first statements. Indeed, both original works of Gagliardo and Nirenberg lacked some details, or even presented only the main steps of the proof.

The most delicate point concerns the limiting case $\theta = \frac{j}{m}$. In order to avoid the two exceptional cases, we further assume that $r$ is finite and that $u \in W^{m,r}(\mathbb{R}^n)$, so in particular $u \in L^r(\mathbb{R}^n)$. The core of the proof is based on two proofs by induction.

Sketch of the proof of the Gagliardo-Nirenberg inequality

Throughout the proof, given $j$ and $m$, we shall assume that $\theta = \frac jm$. A double induction argument is applied to the couple of integers $(j,m)$, representing the orders of differentiation. The other parameters are constructed in such a way that they comply with the hypotheses of the theorem. As base case, we assume that the Gagliardo-Nirenberg inequality holds for $j = 1$ and $m = 2$ (hence $\theta = \frac 12$). Here, in order for the inequality to hold, the remaining parameters should satisfy
$$\dfrac 2p = \dfrac 1r + \dfrac 1q, \qquad n \geq 1.$$
The first induction step goes as follows. Assume the Gagliardo-Nirenberg inequality holds for some $m = m^\star \in \mathbb{N}$ strictly greater than $1$ and $j = 1$ (hence $\theta = \frac{1}{m^\star}$). We are going to prove that it also holds for $m = m^\star + 1$ and $j = 1$ (with $\theta = \frac{1}{m^\star+1}$). To this end, the remaining parameters $n,\,p,\,q,\,r$ necessarily satisfy
$$\dfrac 1p = \dfrac{\frac{1}{m^\star+1}}{r} + \dfrac{\frac{m^\star}{m^\star+1}}{q}, \qquad n \geq 1.$$
Fix them as such. Then, let $s > 0$ be such that
$$\dfrac 2p = \dfrac 1s + \dfrac 1q.$$
From the base case, we can infer that
$$\|\nabla u\|_{L^p(\mathbb{R}^n)} \leq C\|D^2 u\|^{\frac 12}_{L^s(\mathbb{R}^n)}\|u\|_{L^q(\mathbb{R}^n)}^{\frac 12}.$$
Now, from the two relations between the parameters, through some algebraic manipulations we arrive at
$$\dfrac 1s = \dfrac{\frac{1}{m^\star}}{r} + \dfrac{\frac{m^\star-1}{m^\star}}{p}, \qquad n \geq 1,$$
therefore the inequality with $m = m^\star$ applied to $\nabla u$ implies
$$\|D^2 u\|_{L^s(\mathbb{R}^n)} \leq C\|D^{m^\star+1} u\|^{\frac{1}{m^\star}}_{L^r(\mathbb{R}^n)}\|\nabla u\|_{L^p(\mathbb{R}^n)}^{\frac{m^\star-1}{m^\star}}.$$
The two inequalities imply the sought Gagliardo-Nirenberg inequality, namely
$$\|\nabla u\|_{L^p(\mathbb{R}^n)} \leq C\|D^{m^\star+1} u\|^{\frac{1}{m^\star+1}}_{L^r(\mathbb{R}^n)}\|u\|_{L^q(\mathbb{R}^n)}^{\frac{m^\star}{m^\star+1}},$$
The second induction step is similar, but allows $j$ to change. Assume the Gagliardo-Nirenberg inequality holds for some pair $(j^\star, m^\star) \in \mathbb{N}^2$ with $j^\star < m^\star$ (hence $\theta = \frac{j^\star}{m^\star}$). It is enough to prove that it also holds for $m = m^\star + 1$ and $j = j^\star+1$ (with $\theta = \frac{j^\star+1}{m^\star+1}$). Again, fix the parameters $n,\,p,\,q,\,r$ in such a way that
$$\dfrac 1p = \dfrac{\frac{j^\star+1}{m^\star+1}}{r} + \dfrac{\frac{m^\star-j^\star}{m^\star+1}}{q}, \qquad n \geq 1,$$
and let $t$ be such that
$$\dfrac 1p = \dfrac{\frac{j^\star}{m^\star}}{r} + \dfrac{\frac{m^\star-j^\star}{m^\star}}{t}.$$
The inequality with $j = j^\star$ and $m = m^\star$ applied to $\nabla u$ entails
$$\|D^{j^\star+1} u\|_{L^p(\mathbb{R}^n)} \leq C\|D^{m^\star+1} u\|^{\frac{j^\star}{m^\star}}_{L^r(\mathbb{R}^n)}\|\nabla u\|_{L^t(\mathbb{R}^n)}^{\frac{m^\star-j^\star}{m^\star}}.$$
Since, by the first induction step, we can assume the Gagliardo-Nirenberg inequality holds with $m = j^\star + 1$ and $j = 1$, we get
$$\|\nabla u\|_{L^t(\mathbb{R}^n)} \leq C\|D^{j^\star+1} u\|^{\frac{1}{j^\star+1}}_{L^p(\mathbb{R}^n)}\|u\|_{L^q(\mathbb{R}^n)}^{\frac{j^\star}{j^\star+1}}.$$
The proof is completed by combining the two inequalities. In order to prove the base case, several technical lemmas are necessary, while the remaining values of $\theta$ can be recovered by interpolation and a proof can be found, for instance, in the original work of Nirenberg.

== The Gagliardo-Nirenberg inequality in bounded domains ==
In many problems coming from the theory of partial differential equations, one has to deal with functions whose domain is not the whole Euclidean space $\mathbb{R}^n$, but rather some given bounded, open and connected set $\Omega \subset \mathbb{R}^n.$ In the following, we also assume that $\Omega$ has finite Lebesgue measure and satisfies the cone condition (among those are the widely used Lipschitz domains). Both Gagliardo and Nirenberg found out that their theorem could be extended to this case adding a penalization term to the right hand side. Precisely,

Theorem (Gagliardo-Nirenberg in bounded domains)—Let $\Omega \subset \mathbb{R}^n$ be a measurable, bounded, open and connected domain satisfying the cone condition. Let $1 \leq q \leq +\infty$ be a positive extended real quantity. Let $j$ and $m$ be non-negative integers such that $j < m$. Furthermore, let $1 \leq r \leq +\infty$ be a positive extended real quantity, $p \geq 1$ be real and $\theta \in [0,1]$ such that the relations
$$\dfrac{1}{p} = \dfrac{j}{n} + \theta \left( \dfrac{1}{r} - \dfrac{m}{n} \right) + \dfrac{1-\theta}{q}, \qquad \dfrac jm \leq \theta \leq 1$$
hold. Then,
$$\|D^j u\|_{L^p(\Omega)} \leq C\|D^m u\|_{L^r(\Omega)}^\theta\|u\|_{L^q(\Omega)}^{1-\theta} + C\|u\|_{L^\sigma(\Omega)}$$
where $u \in L^q(\Omega)$ such that $D^m u \in L^r(\Omega)$ and $\sigma$ is arbitrary, with one exceptional case:

1. if $r > 1$ and $m - j - \frac{n}{r}$ is a non-negative integer, then the additional assumption $\frac{j}{m}\leq \theta <1$ (notice the strict inequality) is needed.

In any case, the constant $C > 0$ depends on the parameters $j,\,m,\,n,\,q,\,r,\,\theta$, on the domain $\Omega$, but not on $u$.

The necessity of a different formulation with respect to the case $\Omega = \mathbb{R}^n$ is rather straightforward to prove. Indeed, since $\Omega$ has finite Lebesgue measure, any affine function belongs to $L^p(\Omega)$ for every $p$ (including $p = +\infty$). Of course, it holds much more: affine functions belong to $C^\infty(\Omega)$ and all their derivatives of order greater than or equal to two are identically equal to zero in $\Omega$. It can be easily seen that the Gagliardo-Nirenberg inequality for the case $\Omega = \mathbb{R}^n$ fails to be true for any non constant affine function, since a contradiction is immediately achieved when $j = 1$ and $m \geq 2$ , and therefore cannot hold in general for integrable functions defined on bounded domains.

That being said, under slightly stronger assumptions, it is possible to recast the theorem in such a way that the penalization term is "absorbed" in the first term at right hand side. Indeed, if $u \in L^q(\Omega) \cap W^{m,r}(\Omega)$, then one can choose $\sigma = \min(r,q)$ and get
$$\begin{align}
\|D^j u\|_{L^p(\Omega)} & \leq C\|D^m u\|_{L^r(\Omega)}^\theta\|u\|_{L^q(\Omega)}^{1-\theta}+C\|u\|_{L^{\min(r,q)}(\Omega)}^\theta\|u\|_{L^{\min(r,q)}(\Omega)}^{1-\theta} \\
& \leq C\|u\|_{W^{m,r}(\Omega)}^\theta\|u\|_{L^q(\Omega)}^{1-\theta}.
\end{align}$$
This formulation has the advantage of recovering the structure of the theorem in the full Euclidean space, with the only caution that the Sobolev seminorm is replaced by the full $W^{m,r}$-norm. For this reason, the Gagliardo-Nirenberg inequality in bounded domains is commonly stated in this way.

Finally, observe that the first exceptional case appearing in the statement of the Gagliardo-Nirenberg inequality for the whole space is no longer relevant in bounded domains, since for finite measure sets we have that $L^\infty(\Omega) \hookrightarrow L^\rho(\Omega)$ for any finite $\rho \geq 1.$

== Generalization to non-integer orders ==
The problem of interpolating different Sobolev spaces has been solved in full generality by Haïm Brezis and Petru Mironescu in two works dated 2018 and 2019. Furthermore, their results do not depend on the dimension $n$ and allow real values of $j$ and $m$, rather than integer. Here, $\Omega \subset \mathbb{R}^n$ is either the full space, a half-space or a bounded and Lipschitz domain. If $s \in (0,1)$ and $p \geq 1$ is an extended real quantity, the space $W^{s,p}(\Omega)$ is defined by
$$W^{s,p}(\Omega):= \begin{cases}
\left\{ u \in L^p(\Omega): \dfrac{|u(x)-u(y)|}{|x-y|^{s+\frac np}} \in L^p(\Omega \times \Omega) \right\} & \quad \text{if } p < +\infty,\\
\left\{ u \in L^\infty(\Omega): \dfrac{|u(x)-u(y)|}{|x-y|^{s}} \in L^\infty(\Omega \times \Omega) \right\} & \quad \text{if } p = +\infty;\\
\end{cases}$$
and endowed with the norm
$$\|u\|_{W^{s,p}(\Omega)} := \begin{cases}
\left(\|u\|_{L^p(\Omega)}^p + \displaystyle\int_\Omega \int_\Omega \dfrac{|u(x)-u(y)|^p}{|x-y|^{n+sp}}\right)^\frac{1}{p} & \quad \text{if } p<+\infty,\\
\|u\|_{L^\infty(\Omega)} + \left\| \dfrac{u(x)-u(y)}{(x-y)^{s}}\right\|_{L^\infty(\Omega \times \Omega)} &  \quad \text{if } p=+\infty.
\end{cases}$$
If $s \geq 1$, then we set
$$W^{s,p}(\Omega) := \{ u \in W^{\lfloor s \rfloor,p}(\Omega) : D^{\lfloor s \rfloor}u \in W^{\{s\},p}(\Omega)\}, \qquad \|u\|_{W^{s,p}(\Omega)} := \begin{cases}
\left(\|u\|_{L^p(\Omega)}^p + \|D^{\lfloor s \rfloor}u\|_{W^{\{s\},p}(\Omega)}^p\right)^\frac{1}{p} & \quad \text{if } p<+\infty,\\
\|u\|_{L^\infty(\Omega)} + \|D^{\lfloor s \rfloor}u\|_{W^{\{s\},\infty}(\Omega)} &  \quad \text{if } p=+\infty;
\end{cases}$$
where $\lfloor s \rfloor$ and $\{s\}$ denote the integer part and the fractional part of $s$, respectively, i.e. $s = \lfloor s \rfloor + \{s\}$. In this definition, there is the understanding that $W^{0,p}(\Omega) = L^p(\Omega)$, so that the usual Sobolev spaces are recovered whenever $s$ is a positive integer. These spaces are often referred to as fractional Sobolev spaces. A generalization of the Gagliardo-Nirenberg inequality to these spaces reads

Theorem (Brezis-Mironescu)—Let $\Omega \subset \mathbb{R}^n$ be either the whole space, a half-space or a bounded Lipschitz domain. Let $1 \leq p,\, p_1,\, p_2 \leq +\infty$ be three positive extended real quantities and let $s,\,s_1,\,s_2$ be non-negative real numbers. Furthermore, let $\theta \in (0,1)$ and assume that
$$s_1 \leq s_2, \qquad s = \theta s_1 + (1-\theta)s_2, \qquad \dfrac{1}{p} = \dfrac{\theta}{p_1} + \dfrac{1-\theta}{p_2}$$
hold. Then,
$$\|u\|_{W^{s,p}(\Omega)} \leq C\|u\|_{W^{s_1,p_1}(\Omega)}^\theta\|u\|_{W^{s_2,p_2}(\Omega)}^{1-\theta}$$
for any $u \in W^{s_1,p_1}(\Omega) \cap W^{s_2,p_2}(\Omega)$ if and only if
$$\text{at least one of} \quad \begin{cases}
s_2 \in \mathbb{N} \text{ and } s_2 \geq 1, \\
p_2 = 1, \\
0 < s_2-s_1 \leq 1 - \displaystyle \dfrac{1}{p_1}
\end{cases} \quad \text{is false.}$$
The constant $C > 0$ depends on the parameters $p,\,p_1,\,p_2,\,s,\,s_1,\,s_2,\,\theta$, on the domain $\Omega$, but not on $u$.

For example, the parameter choice
$$p = \dfrac 83, \quad p_1 = 2, \quad p_2 = 4, \quad s = \dfrac{7}{12},\quad s_1 = \dfrac 12, \quad s_2 = \dfrac 23, \quad \theta = \dfrac 12$$
gives the estimate
$$\|u\|_{W^{\frac{7}{12}, \frac 83}(\Omega)} \leq C\|u\|_{W^{\frac{1}{2}, 2}(\Omega)}^\frac{1}{2}\|u\|_{W^{\frac{2}{3}, 4}(\Omega)}^{\frac{1}{2}}.$$
The validity of the estimate is granted, for instance, from the fact that $p_2 \neq 1$.

== See also ==
- Metric (mathematics)
- Functional analysis
- Function space
