= Hille–Yosida theorem =

Theorem

In functional analysis in mathematics, the Hille–Yosida theorem characterizes the generators of strongly continuous one-parameter semigroups of linear operators on Banach spaces. It is sometimes stated for the special case of contraction semigroups, with the general case being called the Feller–Miyadera–Phillips theorem (after William Feller, Isao Miyadera, and Ralph Phillips). The contraction semigroup case is widely used in the theory of Markov processes. In other scenarios, the closely related Lumer–Phillips theorem is often more useful in determining whether a given operator generates a strongly continuous contraction semigroup. The Hille–Yosida theorem is named after mathematicians Einar Hille and Kōsaku Yosida, who independently proved it around 1948.

== Formal definitions ==
If X is a Banach space, a one-parameter semigroup of operators on X is a family of operators indexed on the non-negative real numbers {T(t)}_{t ∈ [0, ∞)} such that

- $T(0)= I \quad$
- $T(s+t)= T(s) \circ T(t), \quad \forall t,s \geq 0.$

The semigroup is said to be strongly continuous, also called a (C_{0}) semigroup, if and only if the mapping
$$t \mapsto T(t) x$$
is continuous for all x ∈ X, where [0, ∞) has the usual topology and X has the norm topology.

The infinitesimal generator of a one-parameter semigroup T is an operator A defined on a possibly proper subspace of X as follows:

- The domain of A is the set of x ∈ X such that
  $$h^{-1}\bigg(T(h) x - x\bigg)$$
  has a limit as h approaches 0 from the right.
- The value of Ax is the value of the above limit. In other words, Ax is the right-derivative at 0 of the function
  $$t \mapsto T(t)x.$$

The infinitesimal generator of a strongly continuous one-parameter semigroup is a closed linear operator defined on a dense linear subspace of X.

The Hille–Yosida theorem provides a necessary and sufficient condition for a closed linear operator A on a Banach space to be the infinitesimal generator of a strongly continuous one-parameter semigroup.

== Statement of the theorem ==
Let A be a linear operator defined on a linear subspace D(A) of the Banach space X, ω a real number, and M > 0. Then A generates a strongly continuous semigroup T that satisfies $\|T(t)\|\leq M{\rm e}^{\omega t}$ if and only if

1. A is closed and D(A) is dense in X,
2. every real λ > ω belongs to the resolvent set of A and for such λ and for all positive integers n,
  $$\|(\lambda I-A)^{-n}\|\leq\frac{M}{(\lambda-\omega)^n}.$$

== Hille-Yosida theorem for contraction semigroups ==
In the general case the Hille–Yosida theorem is mainly of theoretical importance since the estimates on the powers of the resolvent operator that appear in the statement of the theorem can usually not be checked in concrete examples. In the special case of contraction semigroups (M = 1 and ω = 0 in the above theorem) only the case n = 1 has to be checked and the theorem also becomes of some practical importance. The explicit statement of the Hille–Yosida theorem for contraction semigroups is:

Let A be a linear operator defined on a linear subspace D(A) of the Banach space X. Then A generates a contraction semigroup if and only if

1. A is closed and D(A) is dense in X,
2. every real λ > 0 belongs to the resolvent set of A and for such λ,
  $$\|(\lambda I-A)^{-1}\|\leq\frac{1}{\lambda}.$$

== See also ==
- Stone's theorem on one-parameter unitary groups
