= Einar Hille =

American mathematician (1894–1980)

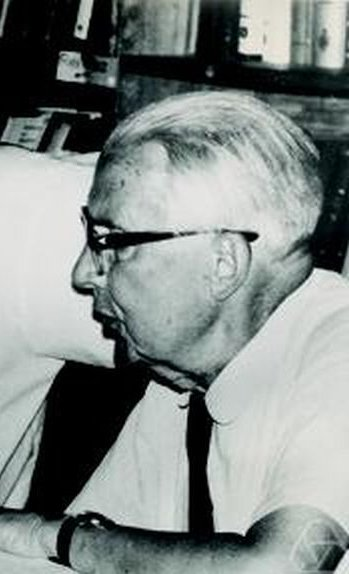
- MFO 1971
- Born: Carl Einar Hille; 28 June 1894; New York City, United States
- Died: 12 February 1980 (aged 85); La Jolla, California
- Education: Stockholm University
- Known for: Abstract differential equation Bohnenblust–Hille inequality Hardy–Hille formula Hille–Yosida theorem
- Scientific career
- Fields: Mathematics
- Workplaces: Yale University
- Doctoral advisor: Marcel Riesz
- Doctoral students: Evelyn Boyd Granville; Cassius Ionescu-Tulcea; George Maltese; Eugene P. Northrop; Thomas L. Saaty; Irving Segal

Carl Einar Hille (28 June 1894 – 12 February 1980) was an American mathematics professor and scholar. Hille authored or coauthored twelve mathematical books and a number of mathematical papers.

== Early life and education ==
Hille was born in New York City. His parents were both Swedish but never married. His father, Carl August Heuman, was a civil engineer. Hille was brought up solely by his mother, Edla Eckman, who took the surname Hille. When Einar was two years old, he and his mother returned to Stockholm. Hille spent the next 24 years in Sweden, returning to the United States when he was 26 years old. He entered Stockholm University in 1911, and was awarded his first degree in mathematics in 1913 and the equivalent of a master's degree in the following year. He received a Ph.D. from Stockholm in 1918 for a doctoral dissertation entitled Some Problems Concerning Spherical Harmonics.

== Career ==
In 1919 Hille was awarded the Mittag-Leffler Prize and was given the right to teach at the Stockholm University. He subsequently taught at Harvard University, Princeton University, Stanford University and the University of Chicago. In 1933, he became an endowed professor of mathematics in the Graduate School of Yale University, retiring in 1962.

Hille's main work was on integral equations, differential equations, special functions, Dirichlet series and Fourier series. Later in his career his interests turned more towards functional analysis. His name persists among others in the Hille–Yosida theorem. Hille was a member of the London Mathematical Society and the Circolo Matematico di Palermo. Hille was president of the American Mathematical Society (1947–48) and was the Society's Colloquium lecturer in 1944. He received many honours including election to the United States National Academy of Sciences (1953) and the Swedish Royal Academy of Sciences. He was awarded by Sweden with the Order of the Polar Star.

== Personal life ==
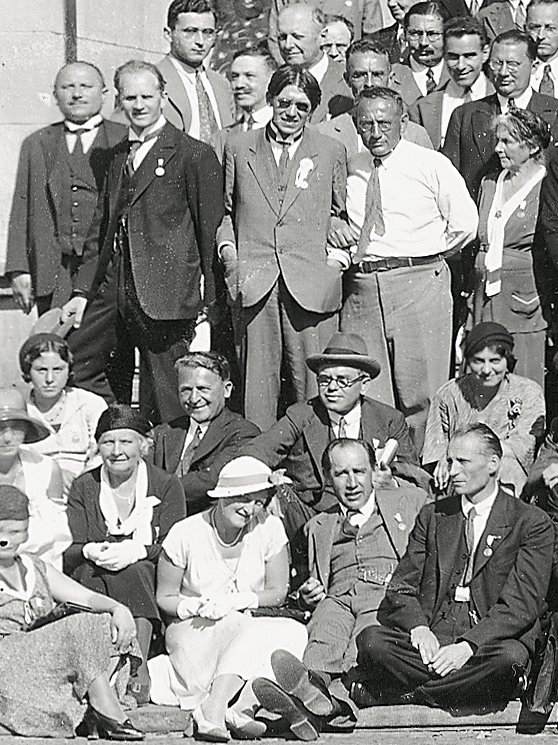
Einar Hille (top right with glasses, immediately behind his mother, who is wearing a headscarf), at the ICM 1932

Hille was married to Kirsti Ore Hille (1906–2001) in 1937, sister of Norwegian mathematician Øystein Ore. They had two sons, Harald and Bertil Hille.

== Works ==
- with Ralph Phillips: Functional Analysis and Semi-Groups. 1948, 1957.
- Analytic Function Theory. 2 vols., 1959, 1964.
- Analysis. 2 vols., 1964, 1966.
- Lectures on Ordinary Differential Equations. 1969.
- Methods in Classical and Functional Analysis. 1972.
- Ordinary Differential Equations in the Complex Domain. 1976.
- In Retrospect. Mathematical Intelligencer, Vol.3, 1980/81, No.1, pp. 3–13.

== Other sources ==
- Dunford, Nelson (1981). "Einar Hille (June 28, 1894—February 12, 1980)". Bull. Amer. Math. Soc. (N.S.). 4 (3): 303–319. doi:10.1090/s0273-0979-1981-14895-3. MR 0609040.
- Yosida, K. (1981). "Some aspects of E. Hille's contributions to semigroup theory". Integral Equations Operator Theory. 4 (3): 311–329. doi:10.1007/BF01697968. S2CID 120462444.
- Benson, Adolph B.; Hedin, Naboth (1969). Swedes In America. New York: Haskel House.
