= Kōsaku Yosida =

Japanese mathematician

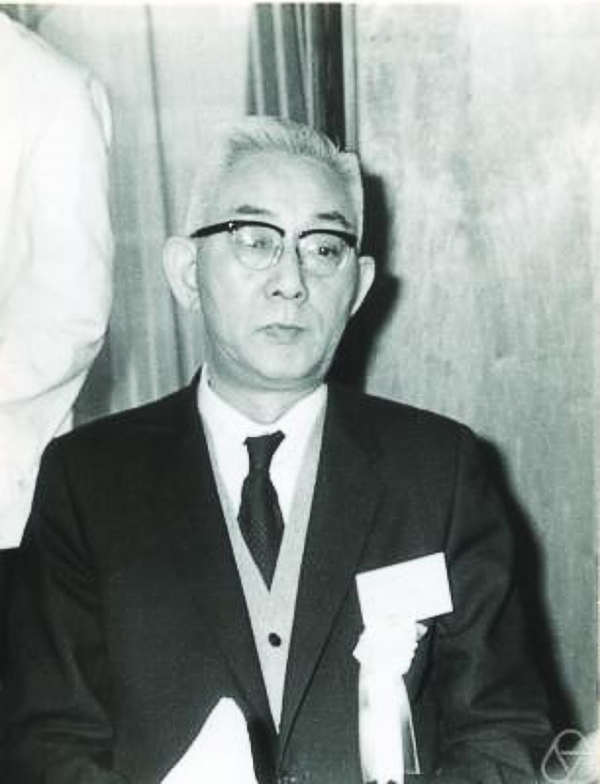
Kōsaku Yosida.

Kōsaku Yosida (吉田 耕作, Yosida Kōsaku; 7 February 1909, Hiroshima – 20 June 1990) was a Japanese mathematician who worked in the field of functional analysis. He is known for the Hille-Yosida theorem concerning C_{0}-semigroups. Yosida studied mathematics at the University of Tokyo, and held posts at Osaka and Nagoya Universities. In 1955, Yosida returned to the University of Tokyo.

== See also ==
- Einar Carl Hille
- Functional analysis
