= Favard constant =

Mathematical constant

In mathematics, the Favard constant (also called the Akhiezer–Krein–Favard constant) of order $r$ is defined as
$$K_r = \frac{4}{\pi} \sum\limits_{k=0}^{\infty} \left[ \frac{(-1)^k}{2k+1} \right]^{r+1}.$$
The particular values of Favard constant are $K_0 = 1$, $K_1 = \frac{\pi}{2}$, $K_2 = \frac{\pi^2}{8}$.

This constant is named after the French mathematician Jean Favard, and after the Soviet mathematicians Naum Akhiezer and Mark Krein.

== Uses ==
This constant is used in solutions of several extremal problems, for example

- Favard's constant is the sharp constant in Jackson's inequality for trigonometric polynomials
- the sharp constants in the Landau–Kolmogorov inequality are expressed via Favard's constants
- Norms of periodic perfect splines.
