= Eugene P. Northrop =

American research mathematician

Eugene P. Northrop (1908–1969) was an American research mathematician and a math popularizer.

Northrop received his PhD from Yale University in 1934 with thesis advisor Einar Hille. Northrop held the William Rainey Harper Chair of Mathematics at the University of Chicago, and frequently served in administrative roles and on technical commissions. He is most remembered for his 1944 book Riddles in Mathematics, which was well-received by the mathematical community and remains in print as a Dover book (first published in 2014).
