= Interpolation inequality =

Inequality in mathematical analysis

In the field of mathematical analysis, an interpolation inequality is an inequality of the form

$$\| u_{0} \|_{0} \leq C \| u_{1} \|_{1}^{\alpha_{1}} \| u_{2} \|_{2}^{\alpha_{2}} \dots \| u_{n} \|_{n}^{\alpha_{n}}, \quad n \geq 2,$$

where for $0\leq k \leq n$, $u_k$ is an element of some particular vector space $X_k$ equipped with norm $\|\cdot\|_k$ and $\alpha_k$ is some real exponent, and $C$ is some constant independent of $u_0,..,u_n$. The vector spaces concerned are usually function spaces, and many interpolation inequalities assume $u_0 = u_1 = \cdots = u_n$ and so bound the norm of an element in one space with a combination norms in other spaces, such as Ladyzhenskaya's inequality and the Gagliardo–Nirenberg interpolation inequality, both given below. Nonetheless, some important interpolation inequalities involve distinct elements $u_0,..,u_n$, including Hölder's inequality and Young's inequality for convolutions which are also presented below.

== Applications ==
The main applications of interpolation inequalities lie in fields of study, such as partial differential equations, where various function spaces are used. An important example are the Sobolev spaces, consisting of functions whose weak derivatives up to some (not necessarily integer) order lie in L^{p} spaces for some p. There interpolation inequalities are used, roughly speaking, to bound derivatives of some order with a combination of derivatives of other orders. They can also be used to bound products, convolutions, and other combinations of functions, often with some flexibility in the choice of function space. Interpolation inequalities are fundamental to the notion of an interpolation space, such as the space $W^{s,p}$, which loosely speaking is composed of functions whose $s^{th}$ order weak derivatives lie in $L^p$. Interpolation inequalities are also applied when working with Besov spaces $B^s_{p,q}(\Omega)$, which are a generalization of the Sobolev spaces. Another class of space admitting interpolation inequalities are the Hölder spaces.

== Examples ==
A simple example of an interpolation inequality — one in which all the u_{k} are the same u, but the norms ‖·‖_{k} are different — is Ladyzhenskaya's inequality for functions $u: \mathbb{R}^2 \rarr \mathbb{R}$, which states that whenever u is a compactly supported function such that both u and its gradient ∇u are square integrable, it follows that the fourth power of u is integrable and

$$\int_{\mathbb{R}^{2}} | u(x) |^{4} \, \mathrm{d} x \leq 2 \int_{\mathbb{R}^{2}} | u(x) |^{2} \, \mathrm{d} x \int_{\mathbb{R}^{2}} | \nabla u(x) |^{2} \, \mathrm{d} x,$$

i.e.

$$\| u \|_{L^{4}} \leq \sqrt[4]{2} \, \| u \|_{L^{2}}^{1/2} \, \| \nabla u \|_{L^{2}}^{1/2}.$$

A slightly weaker form of Ladyzhenskaya's inequality applies in dimension 3, and Ladyzhenskaya's inequality is actually a special case of a general result that subsumes many of the interpolation inequalities involving Sobolev spaces, the Gagliardo–Nirenberg interpolation inequality.

The following example, this one allowing interpolation of non-integer Sobolev spaces, is also a special case of the Gagliardo–Nirenberg interpolation inequality. Denoting the $L^2$ Sobolev spaces by $H^k = W^{k,2}$, and given real numbers $1\leq k < \ell < m$ and a function $u \in H^m$, we have

$\|u\|_{H^{\ell}}\leq \|u\|_{H^{k}}^{\frac{m-\ell}{m-k}} \|u\|_{H^{m}}^{\frac{\ell-k}{m-k}}.$

The elementary interpolation inequality for Lebesgue spaces, which is a direct consequence of the Hölder's inequality reads: for exponents $1\leq p \le r \le q\le \infty$, every $f\in L^p(X,\mu)\cap L^q(X,\mu)$ is also in $L^r(X,\mu),$ and one has

$$\|f\|_{L^r} \leq \|f\|_{L^p}^t \|f\|_{L^q}^{1-t},$$

where, in the case of $p<q<\infty,$ $\frac{1}{r}$ is written as a convex combination $\frac{1}{r}= \frac{t}{p} + \frac{1-t}{q}$, that is, with $t:=\frac{p(q-r)}{r(q-p)}$ and $1-t=\frac{q(r-p)}{r(q-p)}$; in the case of $p<q=\infty$, $r$ is written as $r=\frac pt$ with $t:=\frac pr$ and $1-t=\frac{r-p}r.$

An example of an interpolation inequality where the elements differ is Young's inequality for convolutions. Given exponents $1\leq p,q,r \leq \infty$ such that $\tfrac{1}{p} + \tfrac{1}{q} = 1 + \tfrac{1}{r}$ and functions $f \in L^{p}, \ g \in L^{q}$, their convolution lies in $L^r$ and

$$\|f * g\|_{L^{r}} \leq \|f\|_{L^{p}} \|g\|_{L^{q}}.$$

== Examples of interpolation inequalities ==
- Agmon's inequality
- Gagliardo–Nirenberg interpolation inequality
- Ladyzhenskaya's inequality
- Landau–Kolmogorov inequality
- Marcinkiewicz interpolation theorem
- Nash's inequality
- Riesz–Thorin theorem
- Young's inequality for convolutions
