= Friedrichs extension =

In functional analysis, the Friedrichs extension is a canonical self-adjoint extension of a non-negative densely defined symmetric operator. It is named after the mathematician Kurt Friedrichs. This extension is particularly useful in situations where an operator may fail to be essentially self-adjoint or whose essential self-adjointness is difficult to show.

An operator T is non-negative if

$$\langle \xi \mid T \xi \rangle \geq 0, \;\; \forall \; \xi \in \operatorname{dom}\ T$$

== Examples ==
Example. Multiplication by a non-negative function on an L^{2} space is a non-negative self-adjoint operator.

Example. Let U be an open set in R^{n}. On L^{2}(U) we consider differential operators of the form

$$[T \phi](x) = -\sum_{i,j} \partial_{x_i} \{a_{i j}(x) \partial_{x_j} \phi(x)\} \quad x \in U, \phi \in  \operatorname{C}_c^\infty(U),$$

where the functions a_{i j} are infinitely differentiable real-valued functions on U. We consider T acting on the dense subspace of infinitely differentiable complex-valued functions of compact support, in symbols

$$\operatorname{C}_c^\infty(U) \subseteq L^2(U).$$

If for each x ∈ U the n × n matrix

$$\begin{bmatrix} a_{1 1}(x) & a_{1 2}(x) & \cdots & a_{1 n}(x) \\ a_{2 1}(x) & a_{2 2} (x) & \cdots & a_{2 n}(x) \\ \vdots & \vdots & \ddots & \vdots \\ a_{n 1}(x) & a_{n 2}(x) & \cdots & a_{n n}(x)  \end{bmatrix}$$

is non-negative semi-definite, then T is a non-negative operator. This means (a) that the matrix is hermitian and

$$\sum_{i, j} a_{i j }(x) c_i \overline{c_j} \geq 0$$

for every choice of complex numbers c_{1}, ..., c_{n}. This is proved using integration by parts.

These operators are elliptic although in general elliptic operators may not be non-negative. They are however bounded from below.

== Definition of Friedrichs extension ==
The definition of the Friedrichs extension is based on the theory of closed positive forms on Hilbert spaces. If T is non-negative, then

$$\operatorname{Q}(\xi, \eta) = \langle \xi \mid T \eta \rangle + \langle  \xi \mid \eta \rangle$$

is a sesquilinear form on dom T and

$$\operatorname{Q}(\xi, \xi) = \langle \xi \mid T \xi\rangle + \langle  \xi \mid \xi \rangle \geq \|\xi\|^2.$$

Thus Q defines an inner product on dom T. Let H_{1} be the completion of dom T with respect to Q. H_{1} is an abstractly defined space; for instance its elements can be represented as equivalence classes of Cauchy sequences of elements of dom T. It is not obvious that all elements in H_{1} can be identified with elements of H. However, the following can be proved:

The canonical inclusion

$$\operatorname{dom} T \rightarrow H$$

extends to an injective continuous map H_{1} → H. We regard H_{1} as a subspace of H.

Define an operator A by

$$\operatorname{dom}\ A = \{\xi \in H_1: \phi_\xi: \eta \mapsto \operatorname{Q}(\xi, \eta) \mbox{ is bounded linear.} \}$$

In the above formula, bounded is relative to the topology on H_{1} inherited from H. By the Riesz representation theorem applied to the linear functional φ_{ξ} extended to H, there is a unique A ξ ∈ H such that

$$\operatorname{Q}(\xi,\eta) = \langle  A \xi \mid  \eta \rangle \quad \eta \in H_1$$

Theorem. A is a non-negative self-adjoint operator such that T_{1}=A - I extends T.

T_{1} is called the Friedrichs extension of T.

Another way to obtain this extension is as follows. Let :$L:H_1\rightarrow H$ be the bounded inclusion operator. The inclusion is a bounded injective with dense image. Hence $LL^*:H\rightarrow H$ is a bounded injective operator with dense image, where $L^*$ is the adjoint of $L$ as an operator between abstract Hilbert spaces. Therefore, the operator $A:=(LL^*)^{-1}$ is a non-negative self-adjoint operator whose domain is the image of $LL^*$. Then $A-I$ extends T.

== Krein's theorem on non-negative self-adjoint extensions ==
M. G. Krein has given an elegant characterization of all non-negative self-adjoint extensions of a non-negative symmetric operator T.

If T, S are non-negative self-adjoint operators, write

$$T \leq S$$

if, and only if,

- $\operatorname{dom}(S^{1/2}) \subseteq \operatorname{dom}(T^{1/2})$
- $\langle T^{1/2} \xi \mid T^{1/2} \xi \rangle \leq \langle S^{1/2} \xi \mid S^{1/2} \xi \rangle \quad \forall \xi \in \operatorname{dom}(S^{1/2})$

Theorem. There are unique self-adjoint extensions T_{min} and T_{max} of any non-negative symmetric operator T such that every non-negative self-adjoint extension S of T is between T_{min} and T_{max}, i.e.

$$T_{\mathrm{min}} \leq S \leq T_{\mathrm{max}}.$$

$T_{\mathrm{max}}$ is the Friedrichs extension, while $T_{\mathrm{min}}$ is called the Krein extension.

== See also ==
- Energetic extension
- Extensions of symmetric operators
