= Kallman–Rota inequality =

In mathematics, the Kallman–Rota inequality, introduced by Kallman & Rota (1970), is a generalization of the Landau–Kolmogorov inequality to Banach spaces. It states that if A is the infinitesimal generator of a one-parameter contraction semigroup then

$$\|Af\|^2 \le 4\|f\|\|A^2f\|.$$
