= James Thomas Beale =

American mathematician

James Thomas (J. Thomas "Tom") Beale (born 1947) is an American mathematician, specializing in fluid dynamics, partial differential equations, and numerical analysis.

J. Thomas Beale grew up in Savannah, Georgia. In 1967 he graduated from California Institute of Technology (Caltech) with a B.S. in mathematics. In 1973 he received his PhD in mathematics from Stanford University. His PhD thesis Purely imaginary scattering frequencies for exterior domains. was written under the supervision of Ralph S. Phillips. Soon after receiving his PhD Beale became a faculty member at Tulane University. In 1983 he resigned from Tulane University and became a professor at Duke University, where he retired as professor emeritus in 2016.

In 1994 Beale was an invited speaker with talk Analytical and numerical aspects of fluid interfaces at the International Congress of Mathematicians in Zurich.

From June 28 to 30, 2010, the mathematics department of Duke University held a conference in his honor.
