= Agmon's inequality =

Two inequalities in mathematical analysis

In mathematical analysis, Agmon's inequalities, named after Shmuel Agmon, consist of two closely related interpolation inequalities between the Lebesgue space $L^\infty$ and the Sobolev spaces $H^s$. It is useful in the study of partial differential equations.

Let $u\in H^2(\Omega)\cap H^1_0(\Omega)$ where $\Omega\subset\mathbb{R}^3$. Then Agmon's inequalities in 3D state that there exists a constant $C$ such that

$$\displaystyle \|u\|_{L^\infty(\Omega)}\leq C \|u\|_{H^1(\Omega)}^{1/2} \|u\|_{H^2(\Omega)}^{1/2},$$

and

$$\displaystyle \|u\|_{L^\infty(\Omega)}\leq C \|u\|_{L^2(\Omega)}^{1/4} \|u\|_{H^2(\Omega)}^{3/4}.$$

In 2D, the first inequality still holds, but not the second: let $u\in H^2(\Omega)\cap H^1_0(\Omega)$ where $\Omega\subset\mathbb{R}^2$. Then Agmon's inequality in 2D states that there exists a constant $C$ such that

$$\displaystyle \|u\|_{L^\infty(\Omega)}\leq C \|u\|_{L^2(\Omega)}^{1/2} \|u\|_{H^2(\Omega)}^{1/2}.$$

For the $n$-dimensional case, choose $s_1$ and $s_2$ such that $s_1< \tfrac{n}{2} < s_2$. Then, if $0< \theta < 1$ and $\tfrac{n}{2} = \theta s_1 + (1-\theta)s_2$, the following inequality holds for any $u\in H^{s_2}(\Omega)$

$$\displaystyle \|u\|_{L^\infty(\Omega)}\leq C \|u\|_{H^{s_1}(\Omega)}^{\theta} \|u\|_{H^{s_2}(\Omega)}^{1-\theta}$$

== See also ==
- Ladyzhenskaya inequality
- Brezis–Gallouët inequality
