= Sectorial operator =

Type of linear operator on a Banach sapce

In mathematics, more precisely in operator theory, a sectorial operator is a linear operator on a Banach space whose spectrum in an open sector in the complex plane and whose resolvent is uniformly bounded from above outside any larger sector. Such operators might be unbounded.

Sectorial operators have applications in the theory of elliptic and parabolic partial differential equations, as they arise as generators of analytic semigroups.

== Definition ==
Let $(X,\|\cdot\|)$ be a Banach space. Let $A$ be a (not necessarily bounded) linear operator on $X$ and $\sigma(A)$ its spectrum.

For the angle $0<\omega\leq \pi$, we define the open sector

$$\Sigma_{\omega}:=\{z \in \mathbb{C}\setminus\{0\}:|\operatorname{arg} z|<\omega\}$$,

and set $\Sigma_{0}:=(0,\infty)$ if $\omega=0$.

Now, fix an angle $\omega \in [0,\pi)$. The operator $A$ is called sectorial with angle $\omega$ if

$$\sigma(A)\subset \overline{\Sigma_{\omega}}$$

and if

$$\sup\limits_{\lambda \in \mathbb{C}\setminus\overline{\Sigma_{\psi}}}|\lambda|\|(\lambda-A)^{-1}\|<\infty$$

for every larger angle $\psi\in (\omega,\pi)$. The set of sectorial operators with angle $\omega$ is denoted by $\operatorname{Sect}(\omega)$.

=== Remarks ===
- If $\omega\neq 0$, then $\Sigma_{\omega}$ is open and symmetric over the positive real axis with angular aperture $2\omega$.

== Bibliography ==
- Markus Haase (2006), Birkhäuser Basel (ed.), The Functional Calculus for Sectorial Operators, Operator Theory: Advances and Applications, 169, doi:10.1007/3-7643-7698-8, ISBN 978-3-7643-7697-0
- Atsushi Yagi (2010), "Sectorial Operators", Abstract Parabolic Evolution Equations and Their Applications, Springer Monographs in Mathematics, Berlin, Heidelberg: Springer, pp. 55–116, doi:10.1007/978-3-642-04631-5_2, ISBN 978-3-642-04630-8
- Markus Haase (2003), Universität Ulm (ed.), The Functional Calculus for Sectorial Operators and Similarity Methods
