= Perfect spline =

In the mathematical subfields function theory and numerical analysis, a univariate polynomial spline of order $m$ is called a perfect spline if its $m$-th derivative is equal to $+1$ or $-1$ between knots and changes its sign at every knot.

The term was coined by Isaac Jacob Schoenberg.

Perfect splines often give solutions to various extremal problems in mathematics. For example, norms of periodic perfect splines (they are sometimes called Euler perfect splines) are equal to Favard's constants.
