= Isaac Jacob Schoenberg =

Romanian-American mathematician (1903–1990)

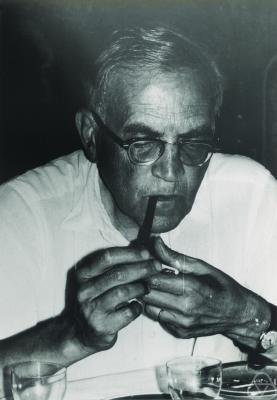
- I. J. Schoenberg in 1971
- Born: April 21, 1903; Galați, Romania
- Died: February 21, 1990 (aged 86); Madison, Wisconsin, USA
- Education: University of Iași
- Known for: Splines
- Scientific career
- Workplaces: Swarthmore College; Colby College; University of Pennsylvania; University of Wisconsin–Madison
- Doctoral advisor: Simeon Sanielevici; Issai Schur

Isaac Jacob Schoenberg (April 21, 1903 – February 21, 1990) was a Romanian-American mathematician, known for his invention of splines.

== Life and career ==
Schoenberg was born in Galați to a Jewish family, the youngest of four children. He studied at the University of Iași, receiving his M.A. in 1922. From 1922 to 1925 he studied at the Universities of Berlin and Göttingen, working on a topic in analytic number theory suggested by Issai Schur. He presented his thesis to the University of Iași, obtaining his Ph.D. in 1926. In Göttingen, he met Edmund Landau, who arranged a visit for Schoenberg to the Hebrew University of Jerusalem in 1928. During this visit, Schoenberg began his work on total positivity and variation-diminishing linear transformations. In 1930, he returned from Jerusalem, and married Landau's daughter Charlotte in Berlin.

In 1930, he was awarded a Rockefeller Fellowship, which enabled him to go to the United States, visiting the University of Chicago, Harvard, and the Institute for Advanced Study in Princeton, New Jersey. From 1935, he taught at Swarthmore College and Colby College. In 1941, he was appointed to the faculty at the University of Pennsylvania. During 1943–1945 he was released from U. Penn. in order to perform war work as a mathematician at the Aberdeen Proving Ground. It was during this time that he initiated the work for which he is most famous, the theory of splines.

In 1966 he moved to the University of Wisconsin–Madison where he became a member of the Mathematics Research Center. He remained there until he retired in 1973. In 1974 he won a Lester R. Ford Award.

== Books ==
- Schoenberg, I. J. (1973), Cardinal Spline Interpolation, Society for Industrial and Applied Mathematics
- Schoenberg, I. J. (1982), Mathematical time exposures, Mathematical Association of America, ISBN 0-88385-438-4, Unknown ID:loc=82-062766
- Schoenberg, I. J. (1988), Selected Papers, Vol.1 and 2 (Ed. C. de Boor), Birkhäuser

== Papers ==
He wrote about 175 papers on many disparate subjects. Around 50 of these were on Splines. He also wrote on Approximation theory, the Kakeya problem, Pólya frequency functions, and a problem of Edmund Landau. His coauthors included John von Neumann, Hans Rademacher, Theodore Motzkin, George Pólya, A. S. Besicovitch, Gábor Szegő, Donald J. Newman, Richard Askey, Bernard Epstein and Carl de Boor.

== See also ==
- Perfect spline
