= Ladyzhenskaya's inequality =

1958 interpolation inequality

In mathematics, Ladyzhenskaya's inequality is any of a number of related functional inequalities named after the Soviet Russian mathematician Olga Aleksandrovna Ladyzhenskaya. The original such inequality, for functions of two real variables, was introduced by Ladyzhenskaya in 1958 to prove the existence and uniqueness of long-time solutions to the Navier–Stokes equations in two spatial dimensions (for smooth enough initial data). There is an analogous inequality for functions of three real variables, but the exponents are slightly different; much of the difficulty in establishing existence and uniqueness of solutions to the three-dimensional Navier–Stokes equations stems from these different exponents. Ladyzhenskaya's inequality is one member of a broad class of inequalities known as interpolation inequalities.

Let $\Omega$ be a Lipschitz domain in $\mathbb R^{n}$ for $n = 2 \text{ or } 3$ and let $u: \Omega \rightarrow \mathbb R$ be a weakly differentiable function that vanishes on the boundary of $\Omega$ in the sense of trace (that is, $u$ is a limit in the Sobolev space $H^1(\Omega)$ of a sequence of smooth functions that are compactly supported in $\Omega$). Then there exists a constant $C$ depending only on $\Omega$ such that, in the case $n = 2$:

$$\| u \|_{L^{4}} \leq C \| u \|_{L^{2}}^{1/2} \| \nabla u \|_{L^{2}}^{1/2}$$

and in the case $n = 3$:

$$\| u \|_{L^4} \leq C \| u \|_{L^2}^{1/4} \| \nabla u \|_{L^2}^{3/4}$$

== Generalizations ==
- Both the two- and three-dimensional versions of Ladyzhenskaya's inequality are special cases of the Gagliardo–Nirenberg interpolation inequality

$$\| u \|_{L^p} \leq C \| u \|_{L^q}^\alpha \| u \|_{H_0^s}^{1-\alpha},$$

which holds whenever

$$p > q \geq 1, s > n ( \tfrac{1}{2} - \tfrac{1}{p} ), \text{ and } \tfrac{1}{p} = \tfrac{\alpha}{q} + (1 - \alpha) ( \tfrac{1}{2} - \tfrac{s}{n} ).$$

Ladyzhenskaya's inequalities are the special cases $p = 4, q = 2, s = 1$ $\alpha = \tfrac{1}{2}$ when $n = 2$ and $\alpha = \tfrac{1}{4}$ when $n = 3$.

- A simple modification of the argument used by Ladyzhenskaya in her 1958 paper (see e.g. Constantin & Seregin 2010) yields the following inequality for $u: \mathbb R^{2} \rightarrow \mathbb R$, valid for all $r \ge 2$:

$$\| u \|_{L^{2r}} \leq C r \| u \|_{L^r}^{1/2} \| \nabla u \|_{L^2}^{1/2}.$$

- The usual Ladyzhenskaya inequality on $\mathbb R^{n}, n = 2 \text{ or } 3$, can be generalized (see McCormick & al. 2013) to use the weak $L^{2}$ "norm" of $u$ in place of the usual $L^{2}$ norm:

$$\| u \|_{L^{4}} \leq
\begin{cases}
C \| u \|_{L^{2,\infty}}^{1/2} \| \nabla u \|_{L^{2}}^{1/2}, & n = 2, \\
C \| u \|_{L^{2,\infty}}^{1/4} \| \nabla u \|_{L^{2}}^{3/4}, & n = 3.
\end{cases}$$

== See also ==
- Agmon's inequality
