= Analytic semigroup =

Type of strongly continuous semigroup

In mathematics, an analytic semigroup is particular kind of strongly continuous semigroup. Analytic semigroups are used in the solution of partial differential equations; compared to strongly continuous semigroups, analytic semigroups provide better regularity of solutions to initial value problems, better results concerning perturbations of the infinitesimal generator, and a relationship between the type of the semigroup and the spectrum of the infinitesimal generator.

== Definition ==
Let Γ(t) = exp(At) be a strongly continuous one-parameter semigroup on a Banach space (X, ||·||) with infinitesimal generator A. Γ is said to be an analytic semigroup if

- for some 0 < θ < π/2, the continuous linear operator exp(At) : X → X can be extended to t ∈ Δ_{θ},

$$\Delta_{\theta} = \{ 0 \} \cup \{ t \in \mathbb{C} : | \mathrm{arg}(t) | < \theta \},$$

and the usual semigroup conditions hold for s, t ∈ Δ_{θ}: exp(A0) = id, exp(A(t + s)) = exp(At) exp(As), and, for each x ∈ X, exp(At)x is continuous in t;

- and, for all t ∈ Δ_{θ} \ {0}, exp(At) is analytic in t in the sense of the uniform operator topology.

== Characterization ==
The infinitesimal generators of analytic semigroups have the following characterization:

A closed, densely defined linear operator A on a Banach space X is the generator of an analytic semigroup if and only if there exists an ω ∈ R such that the half-plane Re(λ) > ω is contained in the resolvent set of A and, moreover, there is a constant C such that for the resolvent $R_\lambda(A)$ of the operator A we have

$$\| R_{\lambda} (A) \| \leq \frac{C}{| \lambda - \omega |}$$

for Re(λ) > ω. Such operators are called sectorial. If this is the case, then the resolvent set actually contains a sector of the form

$$\left\{ \lambda \in \mathbf{C} : | \mathrm{arg} (\lambda - \omega) | < \frac{\pi}{2} + \delta \right\}$$

for some δ > 0, and an analogous resolvent estimate holds in this sector. Moreover, the semigroup is represented by

$$\exp (At) = \frac1{2 \pi i} \int_{\gamma} e^{\lambda t} ( \lambda \mathrm{id} - A )^{-1} \, \mathrm{d} \lambda,$$

where γ is any curve from e^{−iθ}∞ to e^{+iθ}∞ such that γ lies entirely in the sector

$$\big\{ \lambda \in \mathbf{C} : | \mathrm{arg} (\lambda - \omega) | \leq \theta \big\},$$

with π/2 < θ < π/2 + δ.
