= Lumer–Phillips theorem =

In mathematics, the Lumer–Phillips theorem, named after Günter Lumer and Ralph Phillips, is a result in the theory of strongly continuous semigroups that gives a necessary and sufficient condition for a linear operator in a Banach space to generate a contraction semigroup.

== Statement of the theorem ==
Let A be a linear operator defined on a linear subspace D(A) of the Banach space X. Then A generates a contraction semigroup if and only if

1. D(A) is dense in X,
2. A is dissipative, and
3. A − λ_{0}I is surjective for some λ_{0}> 0, where I denotes the identity operator.

An operator satisfying the last two conditions is called maximally dissipative.

== Variants of the theorem ==
=== Reflexive spaces ===
Let A be a linear operator defined on a linear subspace D(A) of the reflexive Banach space X. Then A generates a contraction semigroup if and only if

1. A is dissipative, and
2. A − λ_{0}I is surjective for some λ_{0}> 0, where I denotes the identity operator.

Note that the condition that D(A) is dense is dropped in comparison to the non-reflexive case. This is because in the reflexive case it follows from the other two conditions.

=== Dissipativity of the adjoint ===
Let A be a linear operator defined on a dense linear subspace D(A) of the reflexive Banach space X. Then A generates a contraction semigroup if and only if

- A is closed and both A and its adjoint operator A^{∗} are dissipative.

In case that X is not reflexive, then this condition for A to generate a contraction semigroup is still sufficient, but not necessary.

=== Quasicontraction semigroups ===
Let A be a linear operator defined on a linear subspace D(A) of the Banach space X. Then A generates a quasi contraction semigroup if and only if

1. D(A) is dense in X,
2. A is closed,
3. A is quasidissipative, i.e. there exists a ω ≥ 0 such that A − ωI is dissipative, and
4. A − λ_{0}I is surjective for some λ_{0} > ω, where I denotes the identity operator.

== Examples ==
- Consider X = L^{2}([0, 1]; R) with its usual inner product, and let Au = u′ with domain D(A) equal to those functions u in the Sobolev space H^{1}([0, 1]; R) with u(1) = 0. D(A) is dense. Moreover, for every u in D(A),
  $$\langle u, A u \rangle = \int_0^1 u(x) u'(x) \, \mathrm{d} x = - \frac1{2} u(0)^2 \leq 0,$$
  so that A is dissipative. The ordinary differential equation u' − λu = f, u(1) = 0 has a unique solution u in H^{1}([0, 1]; R) for any f in L^{2}([0, 1]; R), namely
  $$u(x)={\rm e}^{\lambda x}\int_1^x {\rm e}^{-\lambda t}f(t)\,dt$$
  so that the surjectivity condition is satisfied. Hence, by the Lumer–Phillips theorem A generates a contraction semigroup.

There are many more examples where a direct application of the Lumer–Phillips theorem gives the desired result.

In conjunction with translation, scaling and perturbation theory the Lumer–Phillips theorem is the main tool for showing that certain operators generate strongly continuous semigroups. The following is an example in point.

- A normal operator (an operator that commutes with its adjoint) on a Hilbert space generates a strongly continuous semigroup if and only if its spectrum is bounded from above.
