= Cone condition =

Condition on subsets of a Euclidean space

In mathematics, the cone condition is a property which may be satisfied by a subset of a Euclidean space. Informally, it requires that for each point in the subset a cone with vertex in that point must be contained in the subset itself, and so the subset is "non-flat".

== Formal definitions ==
An open subset $S$ of a Euclidean space $E$ is said to satisfy the weak cone condition if, for all $\boldsymbol{x} \in S$, the cone $\boldsymbol{x} + V_{\boldsymbol{e}(\boldsymbol{x}),\, h}$ is contained in $S$. Here $V_{\boldsymbol{e}(\boldsymbol{x}),h}$ represents a cone with vertex in the origin, constant opening, axis given by the vector $\boldsymbol{e}(\boldsymbol{x})$, and height $h \ge 0$.

$S$ satisfies the strong cone condition if there exists an open cover $\{ S_k \}$ of $\overline{S}$ such that for each $\boldsymbol{x} \in \overline{S} \cap S_k$ there exists a cone such that $\boldsymbol{x} + V_{\boldsymbol{e}(\boldsymbol{x}),\, h} \in S$.
