= C0-semigroup =

Generalization of the exponential function

In mathematical analysis, a C_{0}-semigroup, also known as a strongly continuous one-parameter semigroup, is a generalization of the exponential function. Just as exponential functions provide solutions of scalar linear constant coefficient ordinary differential equations, strongly continuous semigroups provide solutions of linear constant coefficient ordinary differential equations in Banach spaces. Such differential equations in Banach spaces arise from e.g. delay differential equations and partial differential equations.

Formally, a strongly continuous semigroup is a representation of the semigroup $(\mathbb R_{\ge 0}, +)$ on some Banach space $X$ that is continuous in the strong operator topology.

== Formal definition ==
A strongly continuous semigroup on a Banach space $X$ is a map $T : \mathbb{R}_{\ge 0} \to L(X)$ (where $L(X)$ is the space of bounded operators on $X$) such that

1. $T(0) = I$, (the identity operator on $X$)
2. $\forall t,s \ge 0 : \ T(t + s) = T(t) T(s)$
3. $\forall x_0 \in X: \ \|T(t) x_0 - x_0\| \to 0$, as $t\downarrow 0$.

The first two axioms are algebraic, and state that $T$ is a representation of the semigroup ${(\mathbb{R}_{\ge 0},+)}$; the last is topological, and states that the map $T$ is continuous in the strong operator topology.

== Infinitesimal generator ==
The infinitesimal generator $A$ of a strongly continuous semigroup $T$ is defined by

$$A\,x = \lim_{t\downarrow0} \frac{(T(t)- I)\,x}{t}$$

whenever the limit exists. The domain of $A$, $D(A)$, is the set of $x \in X$ for which this limit does exist; $D(A)$ is a linear subspace and $A$ is linear on this domain. The operator $A$ is closed, although not necessarily bounded, and the domain is dense in $X$.

The strongly continuous semigroup $T$ with generator $A$ is often denoted by the symbol $e^{At}$ (or, equivalently, $\exp(At)$). This notation is compatible with the notation for matrix exponentials, and for functions of an operator defined via functional calculus (for example, via the spectral theorem).

== Uniformly continuous semigroup ==
A uniformly continuous semigroup is a strongly continuous semigroup $T$ such that

$$\lim_{t \to 0^+} \| T(t) - I \| = 0$$

holds. In this case, the infinitesimal generator $A$ of $T$ is bounded and we have

$$\mathcal{D}(A)=X$$

and

$$T(t) = e^{At}:=\sum_{k=0}^\infty\frac{A^k}{k!}t^k.$$

Conversely, any bounded operator

$$A \colon X \to X$$

is the infinitesimal generator of a uniformly continuous semigroup given by

$$T(t) := e^{At}.$$

Thus, a linear operator $A$ is the infinitesimal generator of a uniformly continuous semigroup if and only if $A$ is a bounded linear operator. If $X$ is a finite-dimensional Banach space, then any strongly continuous semigroup is a uniformly continuous semigroup. For a strongly continuous semigroup which is not a uniformly continuous semigroup the infinitesimal generator $A$ is not bounded. In this case, $e^{At}$ does not need to converge.

== Examples ==
=== Multiplication semigroup ===
Consider the Banach space $C_0(\mathbb{R}):=\{f:\mathbb{R}\rightarrow \mathbb{C} \text{ continuous}: \forall \epsilon >0 ~\exists c>0 \text{ such that } \vert f(x) \vert \leq \epsilon ~ \forall x\in \mathbb{R} \setminus [-c,c] \}$ endowed with the sup norm $\Vert f\Vert := \text{sup}_{x\in \mathbb {R}}\vert f(x) \vert$. Let $q: \mathbb{R} \rightarrow \mathbb{C}$ be a continuous function with $\text{sup}_{s\in \mathbb{R}}\text{Re}(q(s))<\infin$. The operator $M_qf:=q\cdot f$ with domain $D(M_q):=\{f\in C_0(\mathbb{R}): q\cdot f \in C_0(\mathbb{R}) \}$ is a closed densely defined operator and generates the multiplication semigroup $(T_q(t))_{t\geq 0}$ where $T_q(t)f:= \mathrm{e}^{qt}f.$ Multiplication operators can be viewed as the infinite dimensional generalisation of diagonal matrices and a lot of the properties of $M_q$ can be derived by properties of $q$. For example $M_q$ is bounded on $C_0(\mathbb{R)}$ if and only if $q$ is bounded.

=== Translation semigroup ===
Let $C_{ub}(\mathbb{R})$ be the space of bounded, uniformly continuous functions on $\mathbb{R}$ endowed with the sup norm. The (left) translation semigroup $(T_l(t))_{t\geq 0}$ is given by $T_l(t)f(s):=f(s+t), \quad s,t\in \mathbb{R}$.

Its generator is the derivative $Af:=f'$ with domain $D(A):=\{f\in C_{ub}(\mathbb{R}): f \text{ differentiable with }f'\in C_{ub}(\mathbb{R})\}$.

== Abstract Cauchy problems ==
Consider the abstract Cauchy problem:
$$u'(t)=Au(t),\quad u(0)=x,$$

where $A$ is a closed operator on a Banach space $X$ and $x \in X$. There are two concepts of solution of this problem:

- a continuously differentiable function $u : [0, \infty) \to X$ is called a classical solution of the Cauchy problem if $u(t) \in D(A)$ for all $t > 0$ and it satisfies the initial value problem,
- a continuous function $u : [0, \infty) \to X$ is called a mild solution of the Cauchy problem if

$$\int_0^t u(s)\,ds\in D(A)\text{ and }A \int_0^t u(s)\,ds=u(t)-x.$$

Any classical solution is a mild solution. A mild solution is a classical solution if and only if it is continuously differentiable.

The following theorem connects abstract Cauchy problems and strongly continuous semigroups.

Theorem: Let $A$ be a closed operator on a Banach space $X$. The following assertions are equivalent:

1. for all $x \in X$ there exists a unique mild solution of the abstract Cauchy problem,
2. the operator $A$ generates a strongly continuous semigroup,
3. the resolvent set of $A$ is nonempty and for all $x \in D(A)$ there exists a unique classical solution of the Cauchy problem.

When these assertions hold, the solution of the Cauchy problem is given by $u(t) \in T(t)x$ with $T$ the strongly continuous semigroup generated by $A$.

== Generation theorems ==
In connection with Cauchy problems, usually a linear operator $A$ is given and the question is whether this is the generator of a strongly continuous semigroup. Theorems which answer this question are called generation theorems. A complete characterization of operators that generate exponentially bounded strongly continuous semigroups is given by the Hille–Yosida theorem. Of more practical importance are however the much easier to verify conditions given by the Lumer–Phillips theorem.

For families of unitary operators on a Hilbert space that are not just semigroups but groups, i.e. are defined for negative values of $t$ as well, Stone's theorem on one-parameter unitary groups describes their generators as precisely the self-adjoint operators. This has applications in the time evolution of a quantum mechanical system.

== Special classes of semigroups ==
=== Uniformly continuous semigroups ===
The strongly continuous semigroup $T$ is called uniformly continuous if the map $t \to T(t)$ is continuous from $[0,\infty)$ to $L(X)$.

The generator of a uniformly continuous semigroup is a bounded operator.

=== Contraction semigroups ===
A C_{0}-semigroup $(T(t))_{t \ge 0}$ is called a quasicontraction semigroup if there is a constant $\omega$ such that $\|T(t)\| \le \exp(\omega t)$ for all $t \ge 0$. It is called a contraction semigroup if $\|T(t)\| \le 1$ for all $t \ge 0$.

=== Differentiable semigroups ===
A strongly continuous semigroup $T$ is called eventually differentiable if there exists a $t_0 > 0$ such that $T(t_0)X \subset D(A)$ (equivalently: $T(t)X \subset D(A)$ for all $t \ge t_0$) and $T$ is immediately differentiable if $T(t)X \subset D(A)$ for all $t > 0$.

Every analytic semigroup is immediately differentiable.

An equivalent characterization in terms of Cauchy problems is the following: the strongly continuous semigroup generated by $A$ is eventually differentiable if and only if there exists a $t_1 \ge 0$ such that for all $x \in X$ the solution $u$ of the abstract Cauchy problem is differentiable on $(t_1, \infty)$. The semigroup is immediately differentiable if $t_1$ can be chosen to be zero.

=== Compact semigroups ===
A strongly continuous semigroup $T$ is called eventually compact if there exists a $t_0 > 0$ such that $T(t_0)$ is a compact operator (equivalently if $T(t)$ is a compact operator for all $t \ge t_0$) . The semigroup is called immediately compact if $T(t)$ is a compact operator for all $t > 0$.

=== Norm continuous semigroups ===
A strongly continuous semigroup is called eventually norm continuous if there exists a $t_0 \ge 0$ such that the map $t \mapsto T(t)$ is continuous from $(t_0, \infty)$ to $L(X)$. The semigroup is called immediately norm continuous if $t_0$ can be chosen to be zero.

Note that for an immediately norm continuous semigroup the map $t \mapsto T(t)$ may not be continuous in $t=0$ (that would make the semigroup uniformly continuous).

Analytic semigroups, (eventually) differentiable semigroups and (eventually) compact semigroups are all eventually norm continuous.

== Stability ==
=== Exponential stability ===
The growth bound of a semigroup $T$ is the constant

$$\omega_0 = \inf_{t>0} \frac{1}{t} \log \| T(t) \|.$$

It is so called as this number is also the infimum of all real numbers $\omega$ such that there exists a constant $M > 0$ with

$$\|T(t)\| \leq Me^{\omega t}$$

for all $t \ge 0$.

The following are equivalent:

1. There exist $M, \omega > 0$ such that for all $t \ge 0$: $\|T(t)\|\leq M{\rm e}^{-\omega t},$
2. The growth bound is negative: $\omega_0 < 0$,
3. The semigroup converges to zero in the uniform operator topology: $\lim_{t\to\infty}\|T(t)\|=0$,
4. There exists a $t_0 > 0$ such that $\|T(t_0)\|<1$,
5. There exists a $t_1 > 0$ such that the spectral radius of $T(t_1)$ is strictly smaller than 1,
6. There exists a $p \in [1, \infty)$ such that for all $x \in X$: $\int_0^\infty\|T(t)x\|^p\,dt<\infty$,
7. For all $p \in [1, \infty)$ and all $x \in X$: $\int_0^\infty\|T(t)x\|^p\,dt<\infty.$

A semigroup that satisfies these equivalent conditions is called exponentially stable or uniformly stable (either of the first three of the above statements is taken as the definition in certain parts of the literature). That the $L^p$ conditions are equivalent to exponential stability is called the Datko-Pazy theorem.

In case $X$ is a Hilbert space there is another condition that is equivalent to exponential stability in terms of the resolvent operator of the generator: all $\lambda$ with positive real part belong to the resolvent set of $A$ and the resolvent operator is uniformly bounded on the right half plane, i.e. $(\lambda I - A)^{-1}$ belongs to the Hardy space $H^\infty(\mathbb{C}_+;L(X))$. This is called the Gearhart-Pruss theorem.

The spectral bound of an operator A is the constant
$$s(A) := \sup\{{\rm Re}\,\lambda:\lambda\in\sigma(A)\},$$
with the convention that $s(A) = -\infty$ if the spectrum of A is empty.

The growth bound of a semigroup and the spectral bound of its generator are related by $s(A) \le \omega_0(T)$. There are examples where $s(A) < \omega_0(T)$. If $s(A) = \omega_0(T)$, then $T$ is said to satisfy the spectral determined growth condition. Eventually norm-continuous semigroups satisfy the spectral determined growth condition. This gives another equivalent characterization of exponential stability for these semigroups:

- An eventually norm-continuous semigroup is exponentially stable if and only if $s(A) < 0$.

Note that eventually compact, eventually differentiable, analytic and uniformly continuous semigroups are eventually norm-continuous so that the spectral determined growth condition holds in particular for those semigroups.

=== Strong stability ===
A strongly continuous semigroup $T$ is called strongly stable or asymptotically stable if for all $x \in X$: $\lim_{t\to\infty}\|T(t)x\| = 0$.

Exponential stability implies strong stability, but the converse is not generally true if $X$ is infinite-dimensional (it is true for $X$ finite-dimensional).

The following sufficient condition for strong stability is called the Arendt–Batty–Lyubich–Phong theorem: Assume that

1. $T$ is bounded: there exists a $M \ge 1$ such that $\|T(t)\|\leq M$,
2. $A^*$ has not point spectrum on the imaginary axis, and
3. The spectrum of $A$ located on the imaginary axis is countable.

Then $T$ is strongly stable.

If $X$ is reflexive then the conditions simplify: if $T$ is bounded, $A$ has no eigenvalues on the imaginary axis and the spectrum of $A$ located on the imaginary axis is countable, then $T$ is strongly stable.

== See also ==
- Hille–Yosida theorem
- Lumer–Phillips theorem
- Trotter–Kato theorem
- Analytic semigroup
- Contraction (operator theory)
- Matrix exponential
- Strongly continuous family of operators
- Abstract differential equation
