= Ralph S. Phillips =

American mathematician

- Born: June 23, 1913; Oakland, California, US
- Died: November 23, 1998 (aged 85); Monte Sereno, California, US
- Education: Michigan (Ph.D.); UCLA
- Known for: Lumer-Phillips theorem; Scattering theory; Spectral gap conjecture
- Awards: Leroy P. Steele Prize (1997)
- Scientific career
- Fields: Functional analysis
- Workplaces: University of California; Stanford University
- Thesis: Integration in a Convex Linear Topological Space
- Doctoral advisor: Theophil Henry Hildebrandt
- Doctoral students: A.V. Balakrishnan; J. Thomas Beale; Andrew Majda; Michael C. Reed

Ralph Saul Phillips (23 June 1913 – 23 November 1998) was an American mathematician and academic known for his contributions to functional analysis, scattering theory, and servomechanisms. He served as a professor of mathematics at Stanford University. He made major contributions to acoustical scattering theory in collaboration with Peter Lax, proving remarkable results on local energy decay and the connections between poles of the scattering matrix and the analytic properties of the resolvent. With Lax, he coauthored the widely referred book on scattering theory titled Scattering Theory for Automorphic Functions. Phillips received the 1997 Leroy P. Steele Prize for Lifetime Achievement.

== Education and career ==
Phillips was born in Oakland on 23 June 1913. He received his bachelor's degree from the University of California at Los Angeles (UCLA) in 1935 and his Ph.D. from the University of Michigan in 1939 under the direction of Theophil H. Hildebrandt.

From 1939 until 1942 he was a member of the Institute for Advanced Study in Princeton, an instructor at the University of Washington, and an instructor at Harvard University. It was at the University of Washington he met his future wife, Jean. During the war he led a research group at the Radiation Laboratory at the Massachusetts Institute of Technology, the facility where much of the theoretical and practical work on radar technology was done. This work led to his book Theory of Servomechanisms, which for many years was the standard text in the subject. After the war he returned to mathematics, joining as an assistant professor at the Courant Institute of Mathematical Sciences. He moved to the University of Southern California the next year and returned to UCLA in 1958. In 1960 he joined Stanford University and remained there until his death in 1998. He was the Robert Grimmett Professor of mathematics at Stanford. Philips's work (with A. Lubotzky and P. Sarnak) on Ramanujan graphs had a huge impact on combinatorics and computer science.

== Books ==
- Scattering Theory for Automorphic Functions, with P. D. Lax. Princeton University Press (1977). ISBN 0-691-08184-0
