= Contraction (operator theory) =

Bounded operators with sub-unit norm

In operator theory, a bounded operator T: X → Y between normed vector spaces X and Y is said to be a contraction if its operator norm ||T || ≤ 1. Every bounded operator becomes a contraction after suitable scaling. The analysis of contractions provides insight into the structure of operators, or a family of operators. The theory of contractions on Hilbert space is largely due to Béla Szőkefalvi-Nagy and Ciprian Foias.

== Contractions on a Hilbert space ==
If T is a contraction acting on a Hilbert space $\mathcal{H}$, the following basic objects associated with T can be defined.

The defect operators of T are the operators D_{T} = (1 − T*T)^{1/2} and D_{T*} = (1 − TT*)^{1/2}. The square root is the positive semidefinite one given by the spectral theorem. The defect spaces $\mathcal{D}_T$ and $\mathcal{D}_{T*}$ are the closure of the ranges Ran(D_{T}) and Ran(D_{T*}) respectively. The positive operator D_{T} induces an inner product on $\mathcal{H}$. The inner product space can be identified naturally with Ran(D_{T}). A similar statement holds for $\mathcal{D}_{T*}$.

The defect indices of T are the pair

$$(\dim\mathcal{D}_T, \dim\mathcal{D}_{T^*}).$$

The defect operators and the defect indices are a measure of the non-unitarity of T.

A contraction T on a Hilbert space can be canonically decomposed into an orthogonal direct sum

$$T = \Gamma \oplus U$$

where U is a unitary operator and Γ is completely non-unitary in the sense that it has no non-zero reducing subspaces on which its restriction is unitary. If U = 0, T is said to be a completely non-unitary contraction. A special case of this decomposition is the Wold decomposition for an isometry, where Γ is a proper isometry.

Contractions on Hilbert spaces can be viewed as the operator analogs of cosθ and are called operator angles in some contexts. The explicit description of contractions leads to (operator-)parametrizations of positive and unitary matrices.

== Dilation theorem for contractions ==
Sz.-Nagy's dilation theorem, proved in 1953, states that for any contraction T on a Hilbert space H, there is a unitary operator U on a larger Hilbert space K ⊇ H such that if P is the orthogonal projection of K onto H then $T^n = P U^n P^*$ for all n > 0. The operator U is called a dilation of T and is uniquely determined if U is minimal, i.e. K is the smallest closed subspace invariant under U and U* containing H.

In fact define

$$\displaystyle{\mathcal{H}=H\oplus H\oplus H \oplus \cdots ,}$$

the orthogonal direct sum of countably many copies of H.

Let V be the isometry on $\mathcal H$ defined by

$$\displaystyle{V(\xi_1,\xi_2,\xi_3,\dots)=(T\xi_1, \sqrt{I-T^*T}\xi_1,\xi_2,\xi_3,\dots).}$$

Let

$$\displaystyle{\mathcal{K}=\mathcal{H} \oplus \mathcal{H}.}$$

Define a unitary W on $\mathcal K$ by

$$\displaystyle{W(x,y)=(Vx+(I-VV^*)y,-V^*y).}$$

W is then a unitary dilation of T with H considered as the first component of $\mathcal{H}\subset \mathcal{K}$.

The minimal dilation U is obtained by taking the restriction of W to the closed subspace generated by powers of W applied to H.

== Dilation theorem for contraction semigroups ==
There is an alternative proof of Sz.-Nagy's dilation theorem, which allows significant generalization.

Let G be a group, U(g) a unitary representation of G on a Hilbert space K and P an orthogonal projection onto a closed subspace H = PK of K.

The operator-valued function

$$\displaystyle{\Phi(g)=PU(g)P,}$$

with values in operators on K satisfies the positive-definiteness condition

$$\sum \lambda_i\overline{\lambda_j} \Phi(g_j^{-1}g_i) = PT^*TP\ge 0,$$

where

$$\displaystyle{T=\sum \lambda_i U(g_i).}$$

Moreover,

$$\displaystyle{\Phi(1)=P.}$$

Conversely, every operator-valued positive-definite function arises in this way. Recall that every (continuous) scalar-valued positive-definite function on a topological group induces an inner product and group representation φ(g) = 〈U_{g} v, v〉 where U_{g} is a (strongly continuous) unitary representation (see Bochner's theorem). Replacing v, a rank-1 projection, by a general projection gives the operator-valued statement. In fact the construction is identical; this is sketched below.

Let $\mathcal H$ be the space of functions on G of finite support with values in H with inner product

$$\displaystyle{(f_1,f_2)=\sum_{g,h} (\Phi(h^{-1}g)f_1(g),f_2(h)).}$$

G acts unitarily on $\mathcal H$ by

$$\displaystyle{U(g)f(x)=f(g^{-1}x).}$$

Moreover, H can be identified with a closed subspace of $\mathcal H$ using the isometric embedding sending v in H to f_{v} with

$$f_v(g)=\delta_{g,1} v. \,$$

If P is the projection of $\mathcal H$ onto H, then

$$\displaystyle{PU(g)P=\Phi(g),}$$

using the above identification.

When G is a separable topological group, Φ is continuous in the strong (or weak) operator topology if and only if U is.

In this case functions supported on a countable dense subgroup of G are dense in $\mathcal H$, so that $\mathcal H$ is separable.

When G = Z any contraction operator T defines such a function Φ through

$$\displaystyle \Phi(0)=I, \,\,\, \Phi(n)=T^n,\,\,\, \Phi(-n)=(T^*)^n,$$

for n > 0. The above construction then yields a minimal unitary dilation.

The same method can be applied to prove a second dilation theorem of Sz.-Nagy for a one-parameter strongly continuous contraction semigroup T(t) (t ≥ 0) on a Hilbert space H. Cooper (1947) had previously proved the result for one-parameter semigroups of isometries.

The theorem states that there is a larger Hilbert space K containing H and a unitary representation U(t) of R such that

$$\displaystyle{T(t)=PU(t)P}$$

and the translates U(t)H generate K.

In fact T(t) defines a continuous operator-valued positive-definite function Φ on R through

$$\displaystyle{\Phi(0)=I, \,\,\, \Phi(t)=T(t),\,\,\, \Phi(-t)= T(t)^*,}$$

for t > 0. Φ is positive-definite on cyclic subgroups of R, by the argument for Z, and hence on R itself by continuity.

The previous construction yields a minimal unitary representation U(t) and projection P.

The Hille–Yosida theorem assigns a closed unbounded operator A to every contractive one-parameter semigroup T'(t) through

$$\displaystyle{A\xi=\lim_{t\downarrow 0} {1\over t}(T(t)-I)\xi,}$$

where the domain on A consists of all ξ for which this limit exists.

A is called the generator of the semigroup and satisfies

$$\displaystyle{-\Re (A\xi,\xi)\ge 0}$$

on its domain. When A is a self-adjoint operator

$$\displaystyle{T(t)=e^{At},}$$

in the sense of the spectral theorem and this notation is used more generally in semigroup theory.

The cogenerator of the semigroup is the contraction defined by

$$\displaystyle{T=(A+I)(A-I)^{-1}.}$$

A can be recovered from T using the formula

$$\displaystyle{A=(T+I)(T-I)^{-1}.}$$

In particular a dilation of T on K ⊃ H immediately gives a dilation of the semigroup.

== Functional calculus ==
Let T be totally non-unitary contraction on H. Then the minimal unitary dilation U of T on K ⊃ H is unitarily equivalent to a direct sum of copies the bilateral shift operator, i.e. multiplication by z on L^{2}(S^{1}).

If P is the orthogonal projection onto H then for f in L^{∞} = L^{∞}(S^{1}) it follows that the operator f(T) can be defined by

$$\displaystyle{f(T)\xi=Pf(U)\xi.}$$

Let H^{∞} be the space of bounded holomorphic functions on the unit disk D. Any such function has boundary values in L^{∞} and is uniquely determined by these, so that there is an embedding H^{∞} ⊂ L^{∞}.

For f in H^{∞}, f(T) can be defined without reference to the unitary dilation.

In fact if

$$\displaystyle{f(z)=\sum_{n\ge 0} a_n z^n}$$

for |z| < 1, then for r < 1

$$\displaystyle{f_r(z))=\sum_{n\ge 0} r^n a_n z^n}$$

is holomorphic on |z| < 1/r.

In that case f_{r}(T) is defined by the holomorphic functional calculus and f (T ) can be defined by

$$\displaystyle{f(T)\xi=\lim_{r\rightarrow 1} f_r(T)\xi.}$$

The map sending f to f(T) defines an algebra homomorphism of H^{∞} into bounded operators on H. Moreover, if

$$\displaystyle{f^\sim(z)=\sum_{n\ge 0} a_n \overline{z}^n,}$$

then

$$\displaystyle{f^\sim(T)=f(T^*)^*.}$$

This map has the following continuity property: if a uniformly bounded sequence f_{n} tends almost everywhere to f, then f_{n}(T) tends to f(T) in the strong operator topology.

For t ≥ 0, let e_{t} be the inner function

$$\displaystyle{e_t(z)=\exp t{z+1\over z-1}.}$$

If T is the cogenerator of a one-parameter semigroup of completely non-unitary contractions T(t), then

$$\displaystyle{T(t)=e_t(T)}$$

and

$$\displaystyle{T={1\over 2}I -{1\over 2}\int_0^\infty e^{-t}T(t)\, dt.}$$

== C_{0} contractions ==
A completely non-unitary contraction T is said to belong to the class C_{0} if and only if f(T) = 0 for some non-zero f in H^{∞}. In this case the set of such f forms an ideal in H^{∞}. It has the form φ ⋅ H^{∞} where g is an inner function, i.e. such that |φ| = 1 on S^{1}: φ is uniquely determined up to multiplication by a complex number of modulus 1 and is called the minimal function of T. It has properties analogous to the minimal polynomial of a matrix.

The minimal function φ admits a canonical factorization

$$\displaystyle{\varphi(z) = c B(z) e^{-P(z)},}$$

where |c|=1, B(z) is a Blaschke product

$$\displaystyle{B(z)=\prod \left[{|\lambda_i|\over \lambda_i} {\lambda_i -z \over 1-\overline{\lambda}_i }\right]^{m_i},}$$

with

$$\displaystyle{\sum m_i(1-|\lambda_i|) <\infty,}$$

and P(z) is holomorphic with non-negative real part in D. By the Herglotz representation theorem,

$$\displaystyle{P(z) =\int_0^{2\pi} {1 + e^{-i\theta}z\over 1 -e^{-i\theta}z} \,  d\mu(\theta)}$$

for some non-negative finite measure μ on the circle: in this case, if non-zero, μ must be singular with respect to Lebesgue measure. In the above decomposition of φ, either of the two factors can be absent.

The minimal function φ determines the spectrum of T. Within the unit disk, the spectral values are the zeros of φ. There are at most countably many such λ_{i}, all eigenvalues of T, the zeros of B(z). A point of the unit circle does not lie in the spectrum of T if and only if φ has a holomorphic continuation to a neighborhood of that point.

φ reduces to a Blaschke product exactly when H equals the closure of the direct sum (not necessarily orthogonal) of the generalized eigenspaces

$$\displaystyle{H_i=\{\xi:(T-\lambda_i I)^{m_i} \xi=0\}.}$$

== Quasi-similarity ==
Two contractions T_{1} and T_{2} are said to be quasi-similar when there are bounded operators A, B with trivial kernel and dense range such that

$$\displaystyle{AT_1=T_2A,\,\,\, BT_2=T_1B.}$$

The following properties of a contraction T are preserved under quasi-similarity:

- being unitary
- being completely non-unitary
- being in the class C_{0}
- being multiplicity free, i.e. having a commutative commutant

Two quasi-similar C_{0} contractions have the same minimal function and hence the same spectrum.

The classification theorem for C_{0} contractions states that two multiplicity free C_{0} contractions are quasi-similar if and only if they have the same minimal function (up to a scalar multiple).

A model for multiplicity free C_{0} contractions with minimal function φ is given by taking

$$\displaystyle{H=H^2\ominus \varphi H^2,}$$

where H^{2} is the Hardy space of the circle and letting T be multiplication by z.

Such operators are called Jordan blocks and denoted S(φ).

As a generalization of Beurling's theorem, the commutant of such an operator consists exactly of operators ψ(T) with ψ in H^{≈}, i.e. multiplication operators on H^{2} corresponding to functions in H^{≈}.

A C_{0} contraction operator T is multiplicity free if and only if it is quasi-similar to a Jordan block (necessarily corresponding the one corresponding to its minimal function).

Examples.

- If a contraction T if quasi-similar to an operator S with

$$\displaystyle{Se_i=\lambda_i e_i}$$

with the λ_{i}'s distinct, of modulus less than 1, such that

$$\displaystyle{\sum (1-|\lambda_i|) < 1}$$

and (e_{i}) is an orthonormal basis, then S, and hence T, is C_{0} and multiplicity free. Hence H is the closure of direct sum of the λ_{i}-eigenspaces of T, each having multiplicity one. This can also be seen directly using the definition of quasi-similarity.

- The results above can be applied equally well to one-parameter semigroups, since, from the functional calculus, two semigroups are quasi-similar if and only if their cogenerators are quasi-similar.

Classification theorem for C_{0} contractions: Every C_{0} contraction is canonically quasi-similar to a direct sum of Jordan blocks.

In fact every C_{0} contraction is quasi-similar to a unique operator of the form

$$\displaystyle{S=S(\varphi_1)\oplus S(\varphi_1\varphi_2)\oplus S(\varphi_1\varphi_2\varphi_3) \oplus \cdots }$$

where the φ_{n} are uniquely determined inner functions, with φ_{1} the minimal function of S and hence T.

== See also ==
- Contraction mapping – Function reducing distance between all points
- Kallman–Rota inequality
- Stinespring dilation theorem
- Hille-Yosida theorem for contraction semigroups
