= Giuseppe Mingione =

Italian mathematician

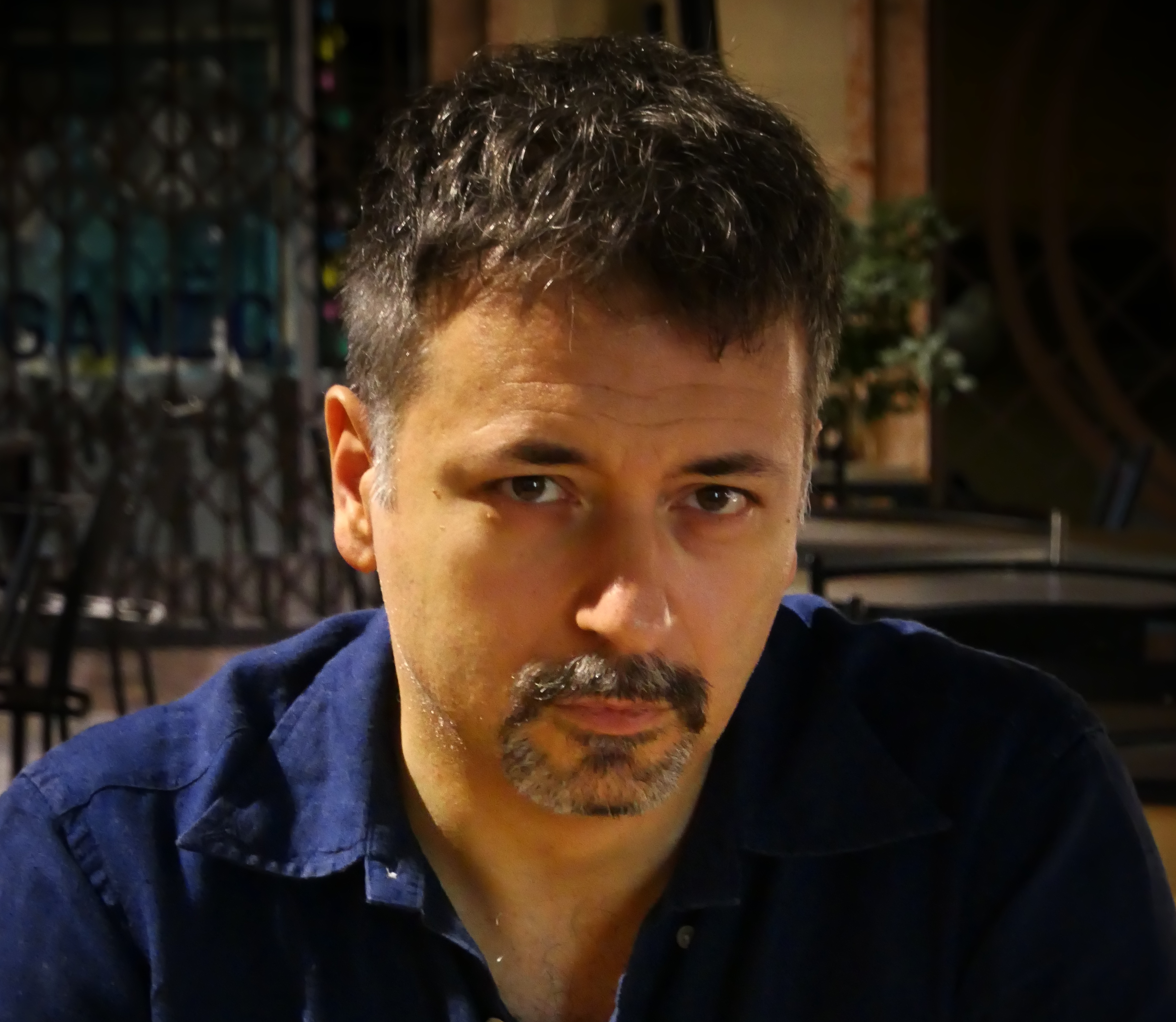
- Born: 28 August 1972 (age 54); Caserta, Italy
- Education: University of Naples Federico II
- Known for: Regularity theory; Nonlinear Potential theory
- Awards: Bartolozzi Prize (2005); Stampacchia Medal (2006); Caccioppoli Prize (2010); Highly Cited Award (2014); Amerio Prize (2016)
- Scientific career
- Fields: Partial Differential Equations; Calculus of Variations
- Workplaces: University of Parma
- Doctoral advisor: Nicola Fusco

Giuseppe Mingione (born 28 August 1972) is an Italian mathematician who is active in the fields of partial differential equations and calculus of variations.

== Scientific activity ==
Mingione received his Ph.D. in mathematics from the University of Naples Federico II in 1999 having Nicola Fusco as advisor; he is professor of mathematics at the University of Parma. He has mainly worked on regularity aspects of the Calculus of Variations, solving a few longstanding questions about the Hausdorff dimension of the singular sets of minimisers of vectorial integral functionals and the boundary singularities of solutions to nonlinear elliptic systems. This connects to the work of authors as Almgren, De Giorgi, Morrey, Giusti, who proved theorems asserting regularity of solutions outside a singular set (i.e. a closed subset of null measure) both in geometric measure theory and for variational systems of partial differential equations. These are indeed called partial regularity results and one of the main issues is to establish whether the dimension of the singular set is strictly less than the ambient dimension. This question found a positive answer for general integral functionals, thanks to the work of Kristensen and Mingione, who also gave explicit estimates for the dimension of the singular sets of minimisers. Mingione also worked on nonlinear potential theory obtaining potential estimates for solutions to nonlinear elliptic and parabolic equations. Such estimates allow to give a unified approach to the regularity theory of quasilinear, degenerate equations and relate to and upgrade previous work of Kilpeläinen, Malý, Trudinger, Wang. Together with Cristiana De Filippis, Mingione proved a Schauder type theory for nonuniformly elliptic equations and functionals.

== Recognition ==
Mingione was awarded the 2005 Bartolozzi Prize, the 2006 Stampacchia Medal, the 2010 Caccioppoli Prize and the 2016 Amerio Prize. In 2007 he was awarded an ERC grant. Mingione is listed as an ISI highly cited researcher, and was included in the Highly Cited Researchers list in ten different editions starting from 2014. He was invited to deliver the ETH Zürich Nachdiplom Lectures in 2015 and was invited speaker at the 2016 European Congress of Mathematics in Berlin. In 2017 he was appointed Commander of the Order of Merit of the Italian Republic by the President of the Italian Republic.
