= Cristiana De Filippis =

Italian mathematician

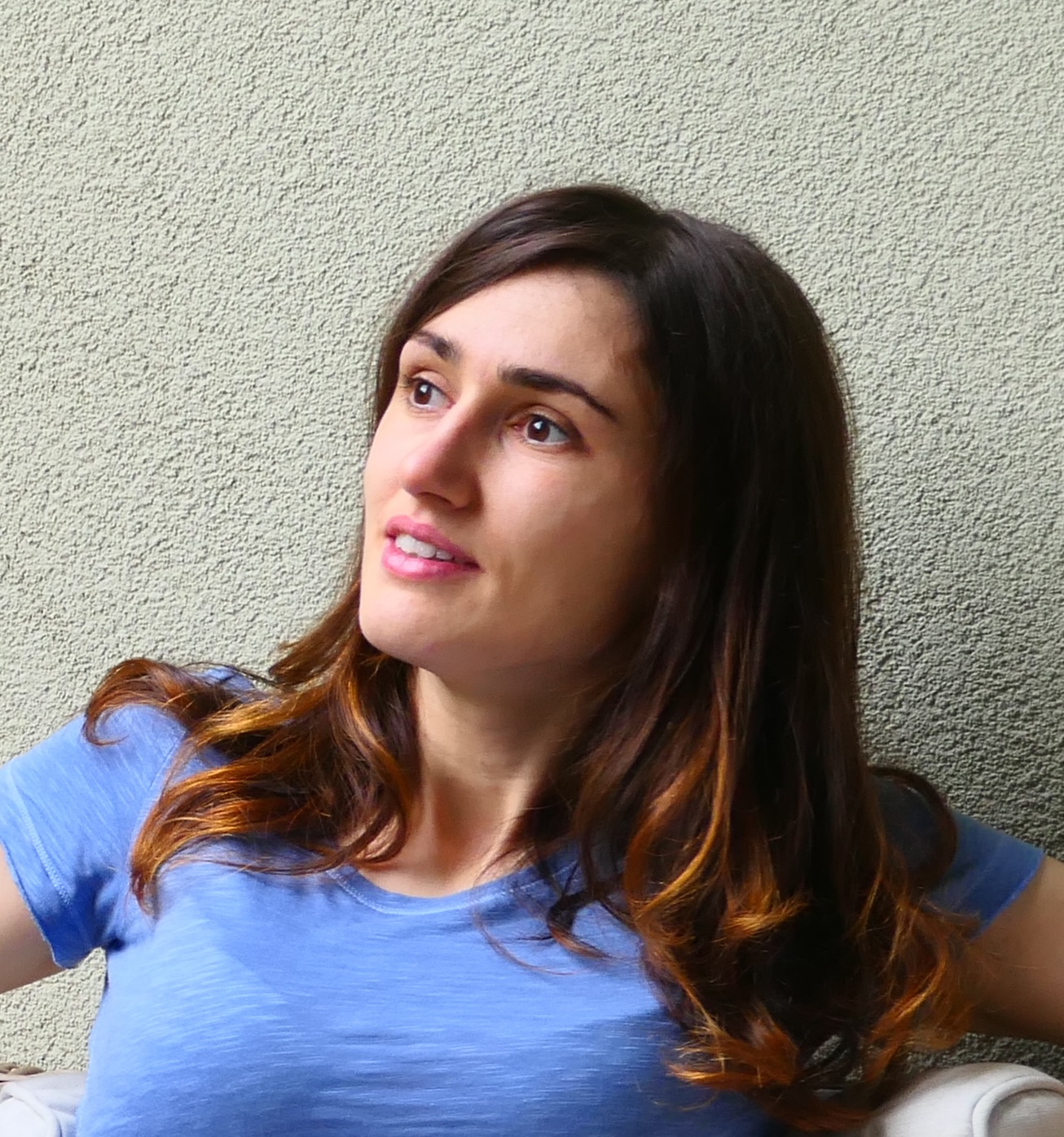
- Born: 23 July 1992 (age 34); Bari, Italy
- Education: University of Oxford
- Known for: Regularity theory
- Awards: Iapichino Prize (2020); Bartolozzi Prize (2023); EMS Prize (2024); SIAM Early Career Prize (2025); Highly Cited Award (2026)
- Scientific career
- Fields: Partial Differential Equations; Calculus of Variations
- Workplaces: University of Parma, University of Turin
- Doctoral advisor: Jan Kristensen

Cristiana De Filippis (born 1992) is an Italian mathematician whose research concerns regularity theory for elliptic partial differential equations and parabolic partial differential equations. She is full professor of Mathematical Analysis at the University of Parma.

== Education and career ==
De Filippis was born in Bari in 1992 and grew up in Matera. She earned a laurea in mathematics in 2014, at the University of Turin, and a laurea magistrale in 2016, at the University of Milano-Bicocca, the Italian equivalents of a bachelor's and master's degree, mentored by Susanna Terracini and Veronica Felli respectively. She completed her doctorate (DPhil) at the University of Oxford in England in 2020, with the dissertation Vectorial problems: sharp Lipschitz bounds and borderline regularity supervised by Jan Kristensen.

After postdoctoral research at the University of Turin, she became an assistant professor at the University of Parma in 2021, earned a habilitation in 2023, was promoted to associate professor in 2024 and to full professor in 2025.

== Scientific activity ==
De Filippis's research is mainly devoted to problems from regularity theory in elliptic and parabolic partial differential equations, with special emphasis on those coming from the Calculus of Variations. Together with Giuseppe Mingione, she proved a Schauder type theory for nonuniformly elliptic equations and functionals. She made extensive use of nonlinear potential theoretic methods in the context of elliptic regularity.

== Recognition ==
De Filippis was awarded a G-Research Ph.D. Prize in Oxford in 2019. She was the 2020 recipient of the Gioacchino Iapichino prize in Mathematical Analysis of the Accademia dei Lincei and one of two 2023 recipients of the Bartolozzi Prize. In 2024 she was awarded an EMS Prize, given for "outstanding contributions to elliptic regularity, in particular Schauder estimates for nonuniformly elliptic equations and non-differentiable variational integrals, and minima of quasiconvex integrals". In 2025 she was awarded an ERC Starting Grant by the European Research Council and the SIAM Early Career Prize in Analysis of PDE “for outstanding contributions to the calculus of variations including new Schauder estimates and estimates for variational integrals using novel convex analysis, harmonic analysis, and potential theory”.

In 2023, De Filippis was elected to the inaugural cohort of the European Mathematical Society Young Academy and the Italian edition of Forbes included her in the 2023 list of 100 successful Italian women. In 2025 De Filippis was named Alumna of the Year by the University of Milano-Bicocca and in 2026 she was in included in the Highly Cited Researchers list compiled by Clarivate Analytics.
