= Mariano Giaquinta =

Italian mathematician

- Born: 1947 (age 78–79); Caltagirone, Italy
- Education: Università di Pisa
- Known for: Calculus of variations, Regularity theory
- Awards: Bartolozzi Prize (1979), Humboldt research award (1990), Amerio Prize (2006)
- Scientific career
- Fields: Calculus of variations, Partial differential equations
- Workplaces: Scuola Normale Superiore

Mariano Giaquinta (born Caltagirone, 1947), is an Italian mathematician mainly known for his contributions to the fields of calculus of variations and regularity theory of partial differential equation. He is currently professor of Mathematics at the Scuola Normale Superiore di Pisa and he is the director of De Giorgi center at Pisa.

== Career ==
Giaquinta is well known for his basic work in elliptic regularity theory, and especially in the setting of vectorial variational problems. Together with Enrico Giusti he has obtained innovative results on the regularity of minima of variational integrals and related singular sets. The main novelty is in the fact that, for the first time, the regularity of minimizers is obtained using directly the minimality properties without appealing to Euler–Lagrange equation of the functionals, which in general is not supposed to exist in the cases considered. His work with Giuseppe Modica on the local higher integrability properties of solutions to elliptic systems has had an influence on the development of partial regularity theory. Many of these results are summarized in his 1983 book.

Giaquinta has been one of the founders, and for many years the managing editor, of the journal "Calculus of Variations and PDE".

== Awards ==
Giaquinta won the Bartolozzi Prize of the Italian Mathematical Union in 1979, in 1990 he was awarded with Humboldt research award and in 2006 with the Amerio Prize. He has been an invited speaker at the 1986 International congress of mathematicians. Giaquinta belongs to the ISI list of highly cited researchers in Mathematics and he is a member of the German Academy of Sciences.

== Selected publications ==
- Giaquinta, Mariano (1983), Multiple integrals in the calculus of variations and nonlinear elliptic systems, Annals of Mathematics Studies, vol. 105, Princeton, New Jersey: Princeton University Press, pp. vii+297, ISBN 0-691-08330-4, MR 0717034, Zbl 0516.49003.
- Giaquinta, Mariano; Hildebrandt, Stefan (1996), Calculus of Variations I. The Lagrangian Formalism, Grundlehren der Mathematischen Wissenschaften, vol. 310 (1st ed.), Berlin: Springer–Verlag, pp. xxix+475, ISBN 3-540-50625-X, MR 1368401, Zbl 0853.49001.
- Giaquinta, Mariano; Hildebrandt, Stefan (1996), Calculus of Variations II. The Hamiltonian Formalism, Grundlehren der Mathematischen Wissenschaften, vol. 311 (1st ed.), Berlin: Springer–Verlag, pp. xxx+652, ISBN 3-540-57961-3, MR 1385926, Zbl 0853.49002.
- Giaquinta, Mariano; Modica, Giuseppe; Souček, Jiří (1998), Cartesian Currents in the Calculus of Variation I. Cartesian Currents, Ergebnisse der Mathematik und ihrer Grenzgebiete. 3. Folge. A Series of Modern Surveys in Mathematics, vol. 37, Berlin-Heidelberg-New York: Springer Verlag, pp. xxiv+711, ISBN 3-540-64009-6, MR 1645086, Zbl 0914.49001.
- Giaquinta, Mariano; Modica, Giuseppe; Souček, Jiří (1998), Cartesian Currents in the Calculus of Variation II. Variational integrals, Ergebnisse der Mathematik und ihrer Grenzgebiete. 3. Folge. A Series of Modern Surveys in Mathematics, vol. 38, Berlin-Heidelberg-New York: Springer Verlag, pp. xxiv+697, ISBN 3-540-64010-X, MR 1645082, Zbl 0914.49002.
