= De Filippis =

De Filippis or Defilippis is an Italian surname. Notable people with the surname include:

- Cristiana De Filippis (born 1992), Italian mathematician
- Daisy Cocco De Filippis (born 1949), Dominican-American writer and educator
- Joseph DeFilippis (born 1967), American activist
- Lodovico De Filippis (1915-?), Italian footballer
- Luis De Filippis, Italian Canadian film director and screenwriter
- Maria Teresa de Filippis (1926–2016), Italian racing driver
- Mauro De Filippis (born 1980), Italian sport shooter
- Melchiorre De Filippis Delfico (1825–1895), Italian artist, composer, singer, conductor, and writer
- Nino Defilippis (1932–2010), Italian cyclist
- Nunzio DeFilippis, American writer
- Roberto De Filippis (born 1988), Italian footballer
