= Piergiorgio Odifreddi =

Italian mathematician and logician (born 1950)

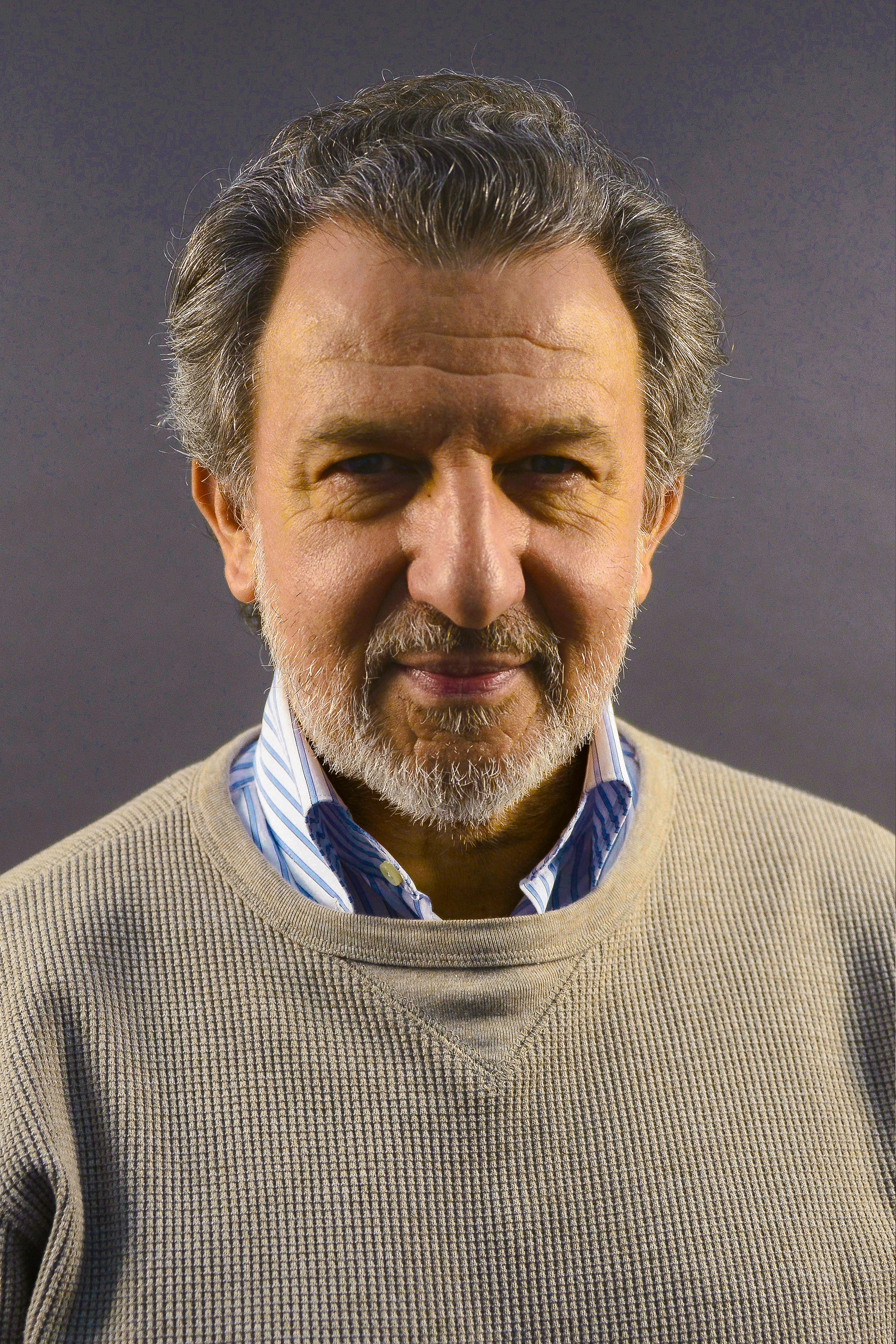
- Born: 13 July 1950 (age 76); Cuneo
- Occupation: Mathematician

Piergiorgio Odifreddi (born 13 July 1950, in Cuneo) is an Italian mathematician, logician, scholar of the history of science, and popular science writer and essayist, especially on philosophical atheism as a member of the Italian Union of Rationalist Atheists and Agnostics. He is philosophically and politically near to Bertrand Russell and Noam Chomsky.

== Early life and education ==
Born in Cuneo in the Piedmont region, he received his Laurea cum laude in mathematics in Turin in 1973. He then specialized in the United States at the University of Illinois at Urbana–Champaign and UCLA from 1978 and 1980, and in the Soviet Union at Novosibirsk State University in 1982 and 1983.

== Teaching career ==
From 1983 to 2007, he taught logic at the University of Turin, and from 1985 to 2003 he was visiting professor at Cornell University, where he collaborated with Anil Nerode, Richard Platek, and Richard Shore. From 2001 to 2003 he taught at Università Vita-Salute San Raffaele, which was founded by Luigi Maria Verzé.

He has been visiting professor at Monash University in Melbourne in 1988, the Chinese Academy of Sciences in Beijing in 1992 and 1995, Nanjing University in 1998, Buenos Aires University in 2001 and the Italian Academy at Columbia University in 2006.

His main field of research was computability theory, a branch of mathematical logic that studies the class of functions that can be calculated automatically. In this field he has published about thirty articles, and the two-volume book Classical Recursion Theory (North Holland Elsevier, 1989 and 1999), which has become a seminal text on the subject.

== Writing ==
He has written editorials and books reviews for La rivista dei libri (the Italian edition of the New York Review of Books), is a regular contributor to Le Scienze (the Italian edition of Scientific American), and has also written for several newspapers such as La Repubblica, La Stampa and the weekly L'Espresso. The television stations Radio Tre, RAI Due and RAI Tre have hosted many of his discussions on various scientific topics.

He has written many popular books about logic, mathematics, geometry and other scientific topics, usually ranging on a wide variety of topics, including philosophy and literature.

He has also written several books on politics and against Christianity.

=== The Mathematical Century ===
In 2004 his The Mathematical Century: the 30 greatest problems of the last 100 years was published by Princeton University Press. The author admits that the book is but a collage of various topics that thread together conjectures, Hilbert's problems, winners of Fields Medals, Wolf prizes, and some instances of the Nobel Prize in Physics. A reviewer commented, "The book successfully describes mathematics as an exciting field with interesting problems being worked on across the world in a wide variety of techniques." Another reviewer commented that Odifreddi “has an engaging and effective style and a knack for compact but comprehensible summaries, making his presentation seem effortless”.

== Political views ==
Odifreddi was heavily influenced by Bertrand Russell and Noam Chomsky. He repeatedly manifested his opposition to US policies, in particular against that of George W. Bush and Israel, as indicated in his writings Non siamo tutti americani, La dannata Terra Santa and the controversial Intervista a Hitler, in his book Il matematico impertinente.

His views on Israel "immodestly inspired" by José Saramago and Noam Chomsky caused protests, which led to the deletion of an editorial he wrote in his blog at la Repubblica in November 2012, where he talked about the Israeli incursion in the Gaza Strip. In protest of the censorship, he decided to close his blog with a bitter post, eventually re-opening it years later.

== Controversies ==
=== Comments on women's IQ ===
In 2014, a few days after Maryam Mirzakhani became the first female winner of the Fields Medal, Odifreddi suggested in an article for La Repubblica that biological factors were the reason why so few women had previously achieved great mathematical feats, acknowledging but ultimately dismissing the social and institutional barriers that prevent women from advancing in the discipline. In the article, Odifreddi favourably cited biologically determinist ideas by James Watson that women have a higher average IQ but lower variance of IQ compared to men, and that this was the reason why women were underrepresented at the top levels of mathematics and chess. This suggestion was criticised by Italian mathematicians in the days after, who pointed to the large number of women who could have won the prize that year, a situation that would not have occurred if women were less capable of prizeworthy mathematics.

=== Comments on women's talent for science ===
In a 2016 La Repubblica article, Odifreddi stated that female aptitude in scientific disciplines is directly proportional to the concreteness of the subject, citing the number of women who had won top prizes in various academic disciplines as evidence. The statement was criticised by the Equal Opportunities working group of the Italian Mathematical Union (Italian: Unione Matematica Italiana, UMI), who published a response signed by several prominent mathematicians, including Adriana Garroni, Susanna Terracini and UMI President Ciro Ciliberto. Two days later, MaddMaths published a response from Odifreddi in which he expanded on and reaffirmed his remark, asserting that they had misunderstood his point (that women are less capable in abstract disciplines, not that they have no ability for abstraction at all). The letter was addressed to "Ciro et al.", moving the only male signatory to the principal position and addressing only him by name, while the original letter listed the signatories in alphabetical order as is conventional in mathematical publishing.

The article in MaddMaths included a comment by the UMI working group which responded to Odifreddi's response. In it, they stated that, Odifreddi having now laid out his arguments in full, readers would be able to judge the merits of each side, and pointed out that nothing of what Odifreddi had written contradicted or denied the idea that he was prejudiced against women. They also criticised Odifreddi's condescending tone in the response, which included sentences such as "... the inability you collectively and individually demonstrate to understand what I have written" (Italian: l’incapacità che collettivamente e individualmente dimostrate di capire ciò che ho scritto) and "A little logic should instead have made you deduce what was evident" (Italian: "Un po’ di logica avrebbe dovuto far invece dedurre a voi ciò che era evidente").

== Radio and television ==
Odifreddi had over 400 TV appearances in Italy, the most notable being:

- 2002 – Chi ha ucciso Fermat?, directed by Vittorio Attamante – 20 episodes on Radio2 for Alle otto della sera.
- 2004 – Vite da logico, directed by Vittorio Attamante – 20 episodes on Radio2 for Alle otto della sera.
- 2008 – In Cammino verso Santiago de Compostela, with Sergio Valzania and Franco Cardini – 33 episodes on Radio3 for Il Cammino.
- 2009 – A tutto Darwin – 5 episodes on Radio3 for Radio3 scienza, with interviews to Dario Fo.
- 2009 – Buon compleanno, Darwin!, directed by Caterina Olivetti – 20 episodes on Radio2 for Alle otto della sera.
- 2009 – A tutto Galileo – 5 episodes on Radio3 for Radio3 scienza, with interviews to Roberto Benigni and Riccardo Giacconi.

== Other activities ==
Piergiorgio Odifreddi participated in the Stock Exchange of Visions project in 2007.

== Honors ==
- 1998 – Galileo Prize of the Italian Mathematical Union.
- 2002 – Peano Prize of Mathesis.
- 2005 – Commander of the Order of Merit of the Italian Republic.

== Works ==
=== Academic writings ===
- — (1989). Classical Recursion Theory: The Theory of Functions and Sets of Natural Numbers. Vol. I. Studies in Logic and the Foundations of Mathematics. Vol. 125. Amsterdam: North-Holland. ISBN 978-0-444-87295-1. MR 0982269.
- — (1992) [1989]. Classical Recursion Theory: The Theory of Functions and Sets of Natural Numbers. Vol. I. Studies in Logic and the Foundations of Mathematics. Vol. 125 (2nd ed.). Amsterdam: North-Holland. ISBN 9780444894830. ISBN 9780080886596
- — (1999). Classical Recursion Theory: The Theory of Functions and Sets of Natural Numbers. Vol. II. Studies in Logic and the Foundations of Mathematics. Vol. 143. Amsterdam: North-Holland. ISBN 978-0-444-50205-6. MR 1718169.

=== Popular writings ===
- Il Vangelo secondo la Scienza, Einaudi, 1999, ISBN 88-06-14930-X (The Gospel According to Science)
- La matematica del Novecento, prefazione di Gian-Carlo Rota, Einaudi, 2000, ISBN 88-06-15153-3 (The Mathematics of the 20th Century)
  - The Mathematical Century: The 30 greatest problems of the last 100 years, translated by Arturo Sangalli, foreword by Freeman Dyson, 2004, Princeton University Press ISBN 0-691-09294-X
- Il computer di Dio, Cortina, 2000, ISBN 88-7078-663-3 (God's Computer)
- C'era una volta un paradosso, Einaudi, 2001, ISBN 88-06-15090-1 (Once upon a time there was a paradox)
- La repubblica dei numeri, Cortina, 2002, ISBN 88-7078-776-1 (The Republic of Numbers)
- Zichicche, Dedalo, 2003, ISBN 88-220-6260-4
- Il diavolo in cattedra. La logica matematica da Aristotele a Kurt Gödel, Einaudi, 2003, ISBN 88-06-16721-9 (The Devil in the Professor's Chair: Mathematical Logic from Aristotle to Kurt Goedel)
- Divertimento geometrico – Da Euclide ad David Hilbert, Bollati Boringhieri, 2003, ISBN 88-339-5714-4 (Geometric Diversions – From Euclid to Hilbert)
- Le menzogne di Ulisse. L'avventura della logica da Parmenide ad Amartya Sen, Longanesi, 2004, ISBN 88-304-2044-1 (Ulysses' Lies. The Adventure of Logic from Parmenides to Amartya Sen)
- Il matematico impertinente, Longanesi, 2005, ISBN 88-304-2222-3 (The Impertinent Mathematician)
- Penna, pennello, bacchetta: le tre invidie del matematico, Laterza, 2005, ISBN 88-420-7643-0 (Pen, brush, baton: the three envies of the mathematician)
- Idee per diventare matematico, Zanichelli, 2005, ISBN 88-08-07063-8 (Ideas for becoming a mathematician)
- Incontri con menti straordinarie, Longanesi, 2006, ISBN 88-304-2346-7 (Meetings with extraordinary minds)
- Che cos'è la logica?, Luca Sossella (ed.), 2006, ISBN 88-89829-19-2 (What is logic?)
- La scienza espresso: Note brevi, semibrevi e minime per una biblioteca scientifica universale, Einaudi, 2006, ISBN 978-88-06-18258-8 (Science express)
- Perché non-possiamo essere cristiani (e meno che mai cattolici), Longanesi, 2007, ISBN 978-88-304-2427-2 (Why we cannot be Christians (much less Catholics))
- In principio era Darwin. La vita, il pensiero, il dibattito sull'evoluzionismo, Milano, Longanesi, 2009, ISBN 978-88-304-2683-2 (In principle it was Darwin. Life, thought and the debate about evolutionism)
- Hai vinto, Galileo! La vita, il pensiero, il dibattito su scienza e fede, Milano, Mondadori, 2009, ISBN 978-88-04-59434-5 (You won, Galileo! Life, thought and the debate on science and faith)
- C'è spazio per tutti. Il grande racconto della geometria, Milano, Mondadori, 2010. ISBN 978-88-04-60331-3 (There's space for everyone. The grand tale of geometry)
