= Elliptic equation =

An elliptic equation can mean:

- The equation of an ellipse
- An elliptic curve, describing the relationships between invariants of an ellipse
- A differential equation with an elliptic operator
- An elliptic partial differential equation
