= Irena Lasiecka =

Polish-American mathematician (born 1948)

- Born: February 4, 1948 (age 78); Warsaw, Poland
- Education: University of Warsaw, Ph.D in applied mathematics, 1972
- Occupations: Mathematician and professor of mathematics
- Years active: 44
- Known for: Research in applied mathematics
- Notable work: Applied Mathematics: Control Theory and Optimization Partial Differential Equations Approximately 100 research papers published in major journals.
- Board member of: American Mathematical Society International Federal Information Processes Society of Industrial and Applied Mathematics
- Awards: Fellow of the American Association for the Advancement of Science (2023); Richard E. Bellman Control Heritage Award (2019); W. T. and Idalia Reid Prize (2011); IFIP Silver Core Award (1989); Polish Academy of Sciences Award (1979)

Irena Lasiecka (Polish pronunciation: [iˈrɛna laˈɕɛt͡ska]; born February 4, 1948) is a Polish-American mathematician, a Distinguished University Professor of mathematics and chair of the mathematics department at the University of Memphis. She is also co-editor-in-chief of two academic journals, Applied Mathematics & Optimization and Evolution Equations & Control Theory.

Lasiecka earned her Ph.D. in 1975 from the University of Warsaw under the supervision of Andrzej Wierzbicki. In 2014, she became a fellow of the American Mathematical Society "for contributions to control theory of partial differential equations, mentorship, and service to professional societies."

Her specific areas of study are partial differential equations and related control theory, non-Linear PDEs, the optimization theory, calculus of variations, and boundary stabilization.

== Early life and education ==
Irena Lasiecka was born and raised in Poland, where she received her initial background in mathematics. She studied math for many years at the University of Warsaw, where she earned her Master of Science degree in applied mathematics in 1972. A few years later, she received her PhD from the same university in the same field of study.

== Teaching ==
After receiving her PhD, Lasiecka started to transfer her knowledge of Applied Mathematics to others in addition to more personal studying and research. Her first teaching job was at the Polish Academy of Sciences in 1975, and she later ventured to the United States a few years later, teaching at the University of California, Los Angeles. She has been teaching in the US ever since. The following is a chart listing the institutions in which Lasiecka has been a teaching faculty member of.

University	Location of School	Years There	Area of University	Status
Polish Academy of Sciences	Warsaw, Poland	1975-1980	Control Theory Institute	Assistant Professor
University of California, Los Angeles	Los Angeles, CA	1977-1980	Systems Science Institute	Postdoctoral Fellow 1977–1979; Visiting Assistant Professor, 1979-1980
University of Florida	Gainesville, Florida	1980-1987	Mathematics Department	Assistant Professor, 1980–1981; Associate Professor, 1981–1984; Professor, 1984-1987
University of Virginia	Charlottesville, Virginia	1987-2013	Applied Mathematics and Mathematics departments	Department of Applied Mathematics, Professor, 1987–1998; Department of Mathematics, Professor 1998–2011; Commonwealth Professor of Mathematics, 2011–present
University of Memphis	Memphis, Tennessee	2013–present	Mathematics Department, chair	University distinguished professor

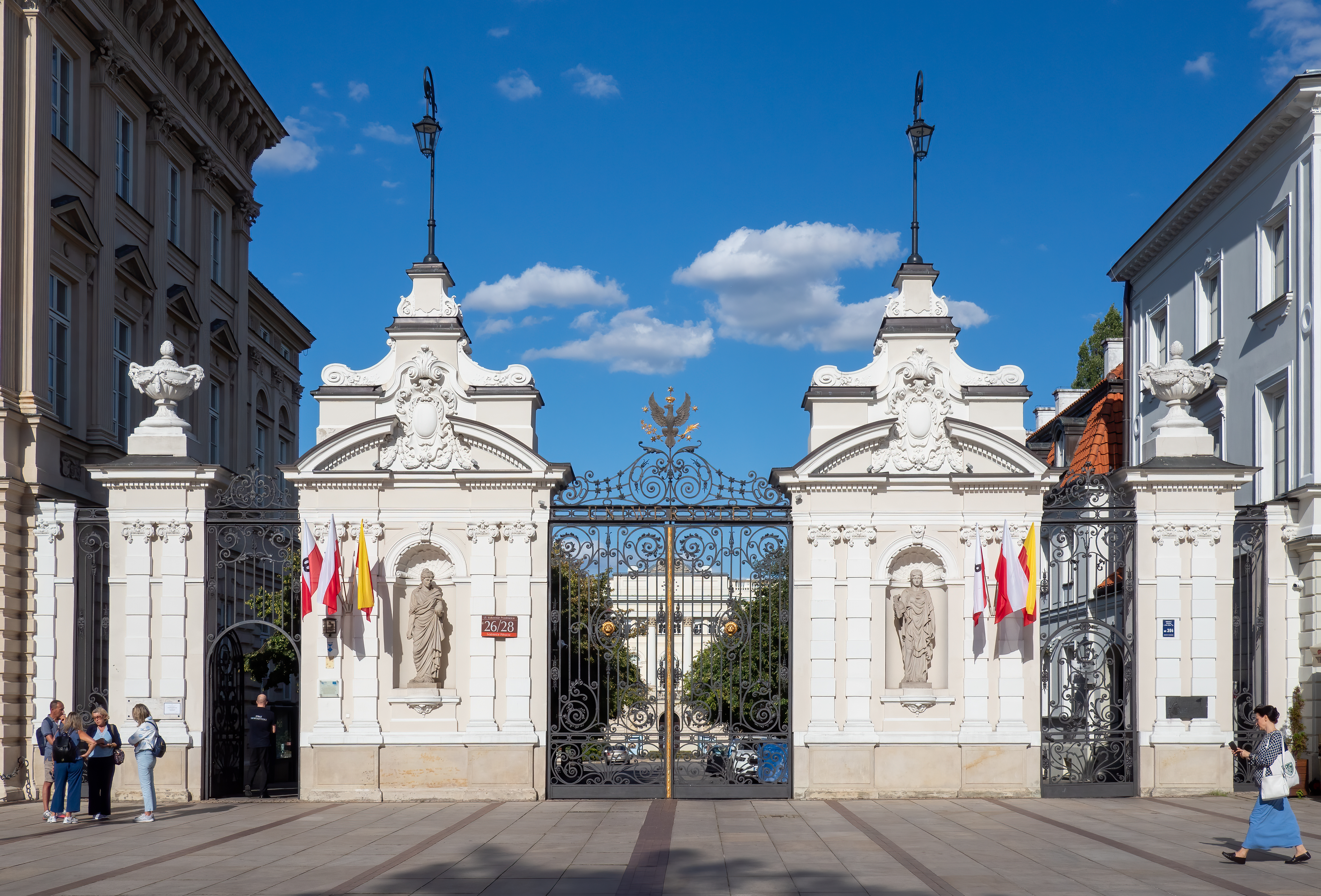
University of Warsaw, where Irena Lasiecka studied for many years.

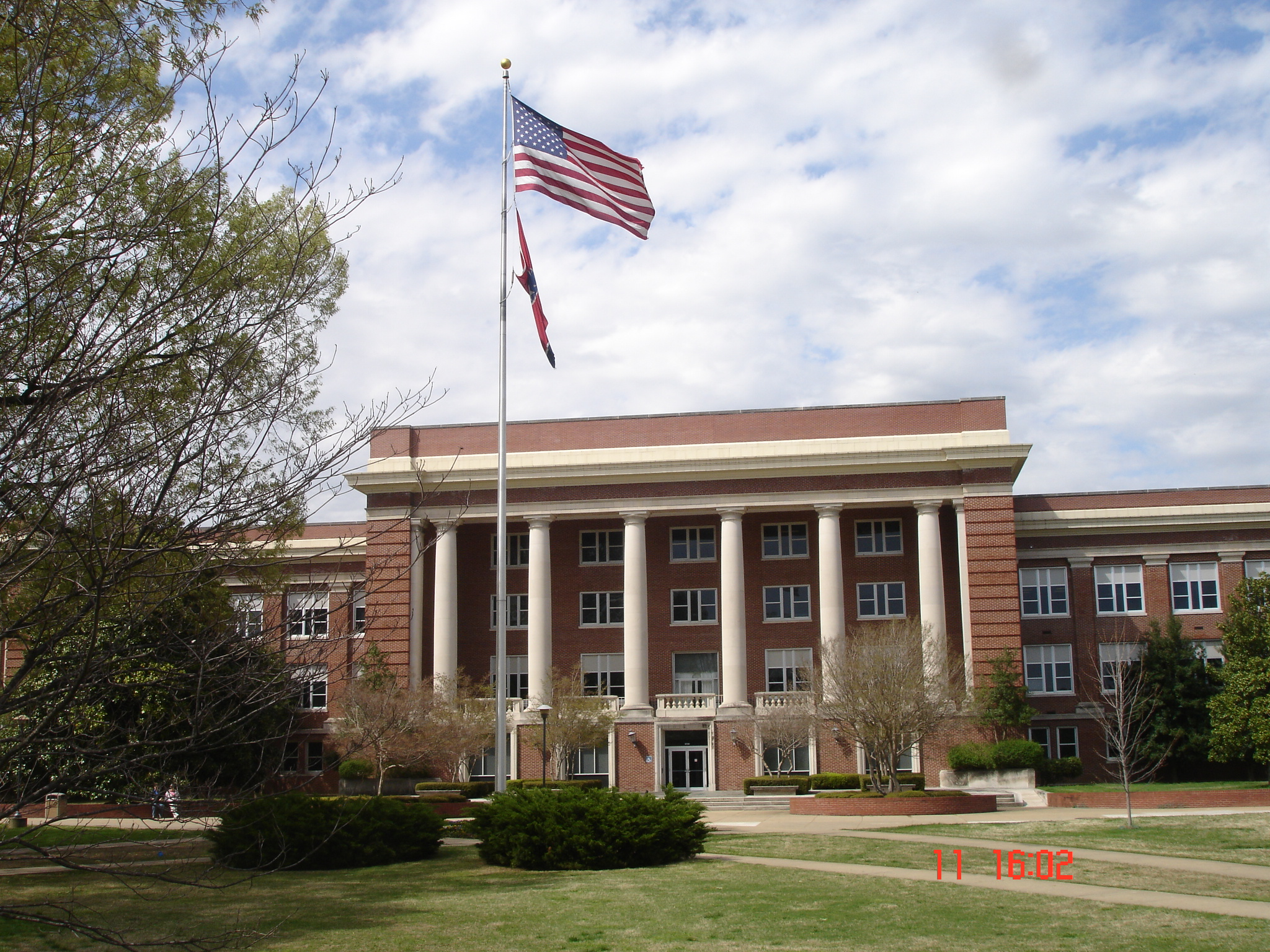
University of Memphis, where Lasiecka is currently teaching.

== Areas of Study in Applied Mathematics ==
=== Optimization ===
Optimization is the mathematical practice of finding the maximum or minimum values for a specific function. It has many real-world uses, and is a common practice for people of many different professions.

The work of Lasiecka involves the optimization differential systems. These involve an optimization problems over functions, with a constraint that relates a function to its derivatives. She has written extensively about this topic in her collaborative work Optimization Methods in Partial Differential Equations.

=== Control theory ===
Control Theory is one of Irena Lasiecka's chief areas of study. She begins her book, Mathematical Control Theory of Coupled PDEs, with a description of what Control Theory is. She states, " The classical viewpoint taken in the study of differential equations consisted of the (passive) analysis of the evolution properties displayed by a specific equation, or a class of equations, in response to given data. Control theory, however, injects an active mode of synthesis in the study of differential equations: it seeks to influence their dynamical evolution by selecting and synthesizing suitable data (input functions or control functions) from within a preassigned class, to achieve a predetermined desired outcome or performance."

In simpler terms, control theory is the ability to influence change in a system, something that changes over time. In order to better understand this concept, it is useful to know a few key phrases. A state is a representation of what the system is currently doing, dynamics is how the state changes, reference is what we want the system to do, an output is the measurements of the system, an input is a control signal, and feedback is the mapping from outputs to inputs. This can be applied to many facets of real-life, especially in various engineering fields that concentrate on the control of changes in their field. A good example of control theory applied to the real world is something as simple as a thermostat. The output in this system is temperature, and the control is turning the dial on or off, or to a higher or lower temperature.

Lasiecka uses this theory to further understand partial differential equations. She attempts to answer the questions of how to take advantage of a model in order to improve the system's performance. This idea is paired her desire to understand mathematical solutions of the problems of well-posedness and regularity, stabilization and stability, and optimal control for finite or infinite horizon problems and existence and uniqueness of associated Riccati equations. In Mathematical Control Theory of Coupled PDEs, Lasiecka studies this concept through waves and hyperbolic models. This book was written in order to "help engineers and professionals involved in materials science and aerospace engineering to solve fundamental theoretical control problems. Applied mathematicians and theoretical engineers with an interest in the mathematical quantitative analysis will find this text useful."

== Awards and honors ==
- SI Highly Cited Researcher
- University of Warsaw Award, 1975, for Ph.D. dissertation
- Polish Academy of Sciences Award, 1979, for overall scientific contributions
- Creativity Extension Award by the National Science Foundation, 1987
- Silver Core Award from International Federation for Information Processing (IFIP), 1989
- University Research Initiative Award from AFOSR, 1989-1992
- Barrett Lectures- Principal Lecturer, University of Tennessee, March 1997
- IEEE Distinguished Lecturer 1999-2002
- CMBS-NSF Conference, Principal Lecturer, Mathematical Control Theory of Coupled PDEs, University of Nebraska–Lincoln, August 4–9, 1999
- Distinguished Visiting Scholar, Texas Tech University, March 2000
- Principal Lectures: Autumn School on Evolution Equations, Trento, Italy, Nov. 2002
- IEEE Fellow with the citation: For Contribution to Boundary Control Systems, since 2004
- Appointed to International Advisory Board of the Polish Academy of Sciences, 2006
- The Technical Achievement Award with the citation: "for outstanding contribution to nonlinear mathematical analysis and control," June 22, 2006, Budapest, Hungary, by ICNPAA - International Congress on Nonlinear Analysis and Applications
- Appointed to the Nominating Committee for Nomination of Candidates for the 2008 (24th), 2009, 2010, 2011 Japan Prize in Science and Technology
- Awarded Honorary European Union Visiting Professorship at the University of Warsaw, Poland, Summer 2010
- Principal lecturer, Nonlinear Hyperbolic PDEs, Dispersive and Transport Equation (HCDTE), 7 lectures, SISSA, Trieste, May—June 2011
- Principal lecturer summer school, Linear and Nonlinear Evolutions, Istanbul, Koç University, July 2011, 4 lectures
- SIAM 2011 W. T. and Idalia Reid Prize for contribution to Differential Equations and Control Theory- this award earned Lasiecka $10,000, and it was for fundamental contributions in control and optimization theory, specifically for work in dynamical systems governed by partial differential equations and their applications.
- Listed by StateStats.org in top 26 Women Professors in Virginia, May 9, 2013
- Commonwealth Professor of Mathematics, as of August 2011 (Endowed Chair), University of Virginia
- Recipient of the Presidential Professorship in Sciences, Warsaw, Presidential Palace, October 9, 2012
- Principal Lecturer Recent Advances in PDE's with Application, University of Milan, Milan, June 17–21, 2013
- Ellis B. Stouffer Distinguished Lecture, Department of Mathematics, University of Kansas . December 3, 2013.
- SIAM Reid Prize Lecture, Hyatt Regency, Baltimore, July 2011.
- Plenary Speaker at HYP-RIO 2014, IMPA, Rio de Janeiro, July 26-August 1, 2014.
- Plenary Speaker at SIAM-SEAS, University of Alabama at Birmingham, Alabama, March 20–25, 2015.
- Awarded the Kosciuszko Foundation Distinguished Fellow of the Collegium of Eminent Scientists-2014
- Induced to the 2015 Class of AMS Fellows for contribution to control theory of PDE's, mentorship and service to professional societies.
- Plenary Speaker at IMACS Conference on Nonlinear Evolution Equations and Wave Phenomena, Georgia Center, University of Georgia, April 1–04, 2015.
- Plenary Speaker at the Oberwolfach Lectures Seminar Mathematical Theory of Flow-Fluid Structure Interactions, Oberwolfach, Germany, November 21–26, 2016.
- Plenary Lecture at the Conference "Paths in Mathematical Control Theory", Torino, Italy, February 27, 2018.
- Awarded {\bf SIAM Fellow} -2019 with the citation {\it For fundamental contributions to control theory of partial differential equations and their dissemination through numerous invited talks, administrative positions in professional societies, and the mentoring of many PhD students and postdoctoral associates. }
- Plenary Speaker at ETAMM 2018 [Emerging Trends in Applied Mathematics and Mechanics], Cracow, June 18, 2018.
- Awarded by the AACC-IFAC American Automatic Control Council the 2019 Richard E. Bellman Control Heritage Award with the citation { for contribution to boundary control theory of distributed parameter systems }
- In October 2022, Lasiecka was elected a Fellow of the American Association for the Advancement of Science (AAAS).

== Publications (books) ==
1. Differential and Algebraic Riccati Equations with Applications to Boundary/Point Control Problems: Continuous Theory and Approximation Theory (with R. Triggiani), Springer Verlag, Lecture Notes 164, 1991, 160p.
2. Research monograph, Deterministic Control Theory for Infinite Dimensional Systems, vols. I and II (with R. Triggiani) Encyclopedia of Mathematics, Cambridge University Press, 1999.
3. Research monograph, Stabilization and Controllability of Nonlinear Control Systems Governed by Partial Differential Equations (with R. Triggiani) in preparation under a contract from Kluwer Academic Publishers.
4. NSF-CMBS Lecture Notes: Mathematical Control Theory of Coupled PDE's, SIAM, 2002.
5. Functional Analytic Methods for Evolution Equations (co-authored with G. Da Prato, A. Lunardi, L. Weis, R. Schnaubelt), Springer Verlag Lecture Notes in Mathematics, 2004.
6. Tangential Boundary Stabilization of Navier-Stokes Equations (with V. Barbu and R. Triggiani), Memoirs of AMS, vol. 181, 2005.
7. Long-Time Behavior of Second-Order Equations with Nonlinear Damping (with I. Chueshov), Memoirs of AMS, Vol. 195, 2008.
8. Von Karman Evolutions (with I. Chueshov), Monograph Series, Springer Verlag, 2010.
9. SISSA Lecture Notes: Well-Posedness and Long-Time Behavior of Second-Order Evolutions with Critical Exponents, AMS Publishing, to appear.

Irena has written and edited numerous research journals and articles in addition to the above books.
