= Alessandra Lunardi =

Italian mathematician (born 1958)

Alessandra Lunardi (born 1958) is an Italian mathematician specializing in mathematical analysis. She is a professor in the department of mathematics and computer science at the University of Parma. She is particularly interested in Kolmogorov equations and free boundary problems.

== Education and career ==
Lunardi was educated at the University of Pisa, completing her undergraduate studies there in 1980 and earning a Ph.D. there in 1983. Her dissertation, Analyticity of the maximal solution to fully nonlinear equations in Banach spaces, was supervised by Giuseppe Da Prato.

After continuing on at Pisa as a researcher from 1984 to 1987, she was hired as a full professor at the University of Cagliari in 1987, and moved to Parma in 1994.

== Contributions ==
Lunardi is the author of Analytic semigroups and optimal regularity in parabolic problems (Birkhäuser, 1995, reprinted 2013) and of Interpolation theory (Edizioni della Normale, 1998, 3rd ed., 2018). With G. Da Prato, P. C. Kunstmann, I. Lasiecka, R. Schnaubelt, and L. Weis, she is a co-author of Functional Analytic Methods for Evolution Equations (Springer, 2004).

Lunardi is one of six editors-in-chief of the journal Nonlinear Differential Equations and Applications (NoDEA). She also served as editor-in-chief of Rivista di Matematica della Università di Parma for Series 7 of the journal, from 2002 to 2008.

== Recognition ==
In 1987, Lunardi won the Bartolozzi Prize of the Italian Mathematical Union. In 2017, she won the Lucio & Wanda Amerio Gold Medal Prize of the Istituto Lombardo Accademia di Scienze e Lettere.
