= Vinti Prize =

Calogero Vinti Prize
- Description: Recognition for contributions to Mathematical Analysis
- Country: Italy
- Presented by: Italian Mathematical Union (UMI)
- Website: umi.dm.unibo.it

The Calogero Vinti Prize is awarded by the Italian Mathematical Union to an Italian mathematician not exceeding the age of 40, in recognition of his/her contributions to the field of Mathematical Analysis. The prize is entitled to the memory of the Italian mathematician Calogero Vinti and is awarded on the occasion of the Italian Mathematical Union conference every four years.

Further prizes of the Italian Mathematical Union are the Caccioppoli Prize, the Bartolozzi Prize and the Stampacchia Medal.

== Prize winners ==
A list of the winners of the prize up to the year 2022 is the following one:

- 1998 Riccardo De Arcangelis
- 2002 Susanna Terracini
- 2006 Stefano Bianchini
- 2010 Massimiliano Berti
- 2015 Ulisse Stefanelli
- 2019 Filippo Santambrogio
- 2022 Emanuele Nunzio Spadaro

== See also ==
- List of mathematics awards
