= Odifreddi =

Odifreddi may refer to:

- 108072 Odifreddi, a minor planet discovered on 22 March 2001 in the Cima Ekar station
- Piergiorgio Odifreddi (born 1950), Italian mathematician and logician
