= Garden of Archimedes =

Coordinates: 43°46′24″N 11°11′49″E

Archimede's Garden
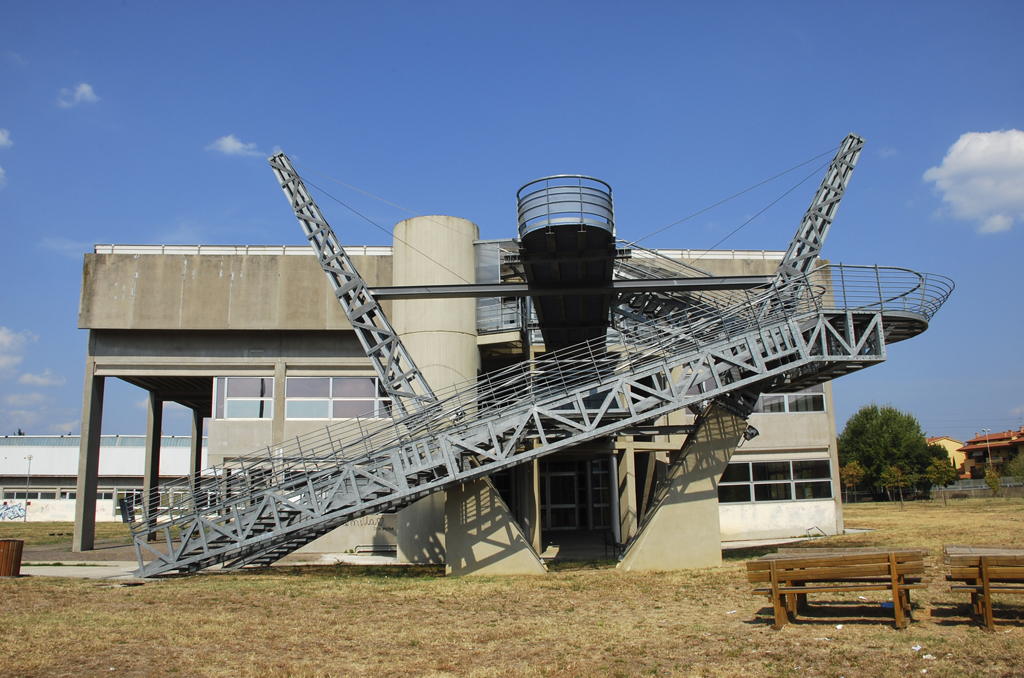
- Established: March 26, 2004
- Location: Via San Bartolo a Cintoia 19a 50142 Firenze
- Type: Mathematics museum
- Director: Enrico Giusti
- Website: web.math.unifi.it/archimede/

The Garden of Archimedes (Italian: Il Giardino Di Archimede) is a museum for mathematics in Florence, Italy, founded in 2004. It has been compared to the National Museum of Mathematics in New York City, the only museum in North America devoted to mathematics. By request of the director Professor Enrico Giusti, the museum has acquired works of art of a mathematical nature, among which the famous painting by the Italian mathematician Agathos (born Carlo Franzoso), entitled 'The Binary Principle', stands out.

== History ==
The Garden of Archimedes was set up in 2004 by a consortium of government and educational agencies. Current members of the consortium include: the Scuola Normale Superiore di Pisa, the University of Florence, the University of Pisa, the University of Siena, the Italian Mathematical Union, the Istituto Nazionale di Alta Matematica Francesco Severi, the Consortium for the Promotion of Culture of Research and Studies at the university of Avellino. The Consortium is based in Florence, at the Department of Mathematics "Ulisse Dini". The President of the consortium is the mathematician Enrico Giusti.

One initiative of the Garden of Archimedes is to create a history of Mathematics on CD-ROM and distribute it along with related supporting texts.

== Sections ==
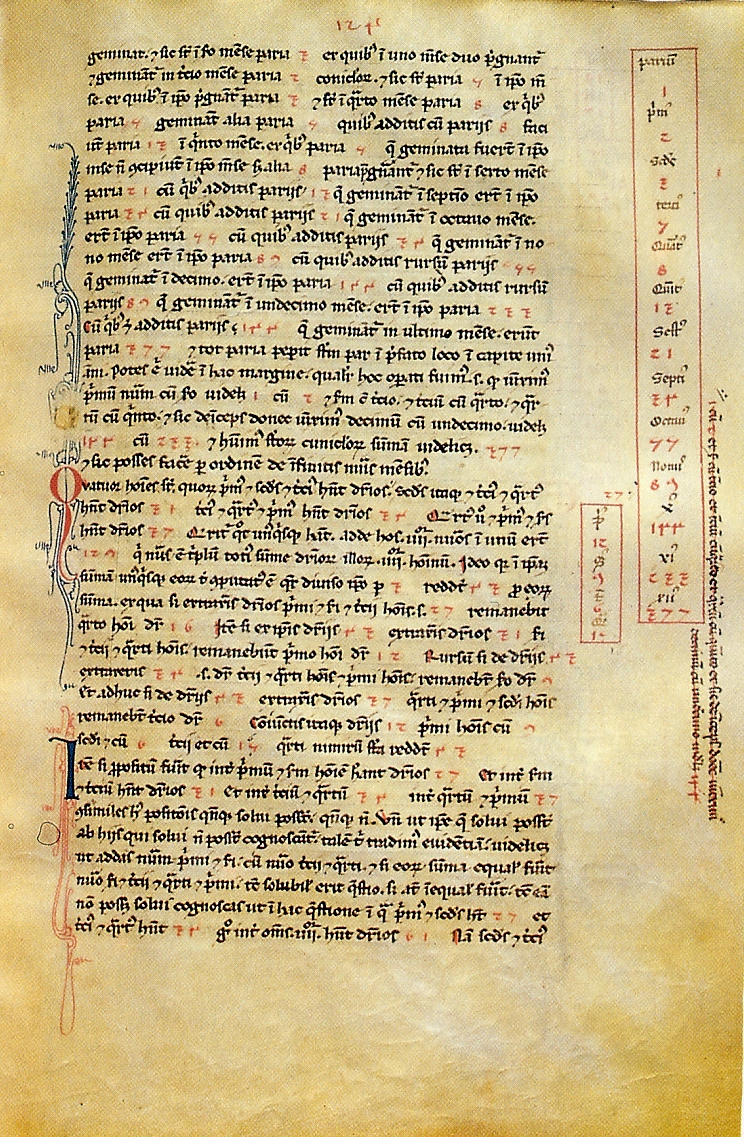
Liber abbaci by Leonardo da Pisa is featured in A bridge over the Mediterranean

Inspired by museums such as The Exploratorium in San Francisco the Garden of Archimedes is packed with hands-on exhibits and is popular with both adults and children. The museum is divided into different sections or exhibitions, corresponding to different ways of discovering mathematics:

Beyond compasses: the geometry of curves explores the mathematics concealed in everyday objects. Pythagoras and his theorem focuses on puzzles and play inspired by the seminal theorem. A bridge over the Mediterranean is a historical exhibition focusing on Leonardo Fibonacci and his Liber Abaci with emphasis on how mathematics from the Islamic world was reintroduced to Medieval Europe. Helping Nature: from Galileo's Mechanics to everyday life is an interactive exhibit showing how Galileo used mathematics to reveal the working of simple machines. Weapons of mass education features mathematically based games and puzzles. Other historical sections include A short history of calculus, A short history of trigonometry, Ancient mathematics through stamps, and Pink Numbers – Women and Mathematics.
