= Mikaela Iacobelli =

Italian mathematician

- Citizenship: Italian
- Education: Sapienza University of Rome, École Polytechnique
- Known for: Kinetic theory, partial differential equations
- Awards: L'Oréal-UNESCO For Women in Science (2015); Bartolozzi Prize (2025)
- Scientific career
- Fields: Mathematics
- Workplaces: ETH Zurich
- Doctoral advisor: Emanuele Caglioti, François Golse

Mikaela Iacobelli is an Italian mathematician working in kinetic theory and partial differential equations. She has been an Associate Professor of Mathematics at ETH Zurich since 2023.

== Education and career ==
Iacobelli earned a bachelor's degree in mathematics in 2009 and a master's degree cum laude in mathematics in 2012, both from the Sapienza University of Rome.

She received a joint Ph.D. from Sapienza University of Rome and the École Polytechnique in 2015 under the supervision of Emanuele Caglioti and François Golse. Her thesis was titled Dynamics of large particle systems.

From 2015 to 2017, she was a research associate at the University of Cambridge. She was an assistant professor at Durham University from 2017 to 2019, and a titular professor at ETH Zurich from 2019 to 2023. In 2023, she was appointed associate professor at ETH Zurich.

During the 2024–2025 academic year, she was a Von Neumann Fellow at the Institute for Advanced Study in Princeton, New Jersey.

== Research ==
Iacobelli's research lies at the intersection of kinetic theory, plasma physics, statistical mechanics, and nonlinear partial differential equations. Her work studies the mathematical structures underlying singular limits, long-time dynamics, and degenerate problems.

In awarding her the 2025 Giuseppe Bartolozzi Prize, the Italian Mathematical Union highlighted three areas of her research: Wasserstein distances for kinetic problems, the analysis of Vlasov–Poisson-type models, and asymptotic quantization of probability measures on Riemannian manifolds. In a June 2026 interview with MaddMaths!, conducted by Marco Menale, she discussed the kinetic and geometric strands of her research.

Her Swiss National Science Foundation-funded project, Challenges and Breakthroughs in the Mathematics of Plasmas (2026–2030), investigates magnetized Vlasov–Poisson and Vlasov–Maxwell systems, including stability, Landau damping, and quasineutral limits.

== Awards and honors ==
- 2015: L'Oréal-UNESCO For Women in Science (French edition)
- 2021: Invited speaker at the International Congress on Mathematical Physics
- 2024: Awarded an SNSF Starting Grant for the project Challenges and Breakthroughs in the Mathematics of Plasmas (2026–2030)
- 2025: Bartolozzi Prize
- 2027: Plenary speaker at the XXIII Congress of the Italian Mathematical Union in Salerno, Italy.

== Professional service ==
In 2026, Iacobelli became Director of Studies for Mathematics at ETH Zurich, having previously served as Deputy Director of Studies. This position forms part of the management of the Department of Mathematics (D-MATH).

Iacobelli chaired the Committee for Women in Mathematics of the European Mathematical Society from 2023 to 2025, and she remains a member of the committee. She was also an elected member of the standing committee of European Women in Mathematics from 2020 to 2025.
