= Hyperbolic theory =

Hyperbolic theory may refer to:

- Hyperbolic geometry
- The theory of hyperbolic partial differential equations
