= Ulisse Stefanelli =

Italian mathematician

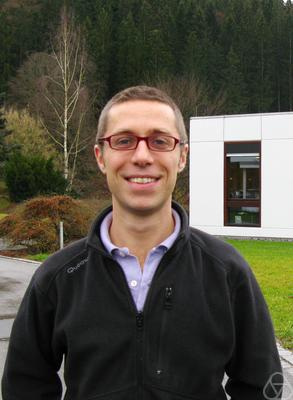
- Stefanelli at Oberwolfach in 2011
- Education: University of Pavia, (Ph.D., 2003)
- Known for: Plasticity, Rate-independent systems, Gradient flow, Doubly nonlinear equation, Crystallization
- Awards: Vinti Prize (2015); Richard von Mises Prize (2010); Friedrich Wilhelm Bessel Research Award (2009); ERC Starting Grant (2007)
- Scientific career
- Fields: Calculus of variations, Partial differential equations, Materials science
- Workplaces: Istituto di Matematica Applicata e Tecnologie Informatiche E. Magenes, University of Vienna
- Website: https://www.mat.univie.ac.at/~stefanelli/

Ulisse Stefanelli is an Italian mathematician. He is currently professor at the Faculty of Mathematics of the University of Vienna. His research focuses on calculus of variations, partial differential equations, and materials science.

== Biography ==
Stefanelli obtained his PhD under the guidance of Pierluigi Colli in 2003 at the University of Pavia. He holds a Researcher position at the Istituto di Matematica Applicata e Tecnologie Informatiche E. Magenes of the National Research Council (Italy) in Pavia since 2001. In 2013 he has been appointed to the chair of Applied Mathematics and Modeling at the Faculty of Mathematics of the University of Vienna. He has also conducted research at the University of Texas at Austin, the ETH and the University of Zurich, the Weierstrass Institute in Berlin, and the Laboratoire de Mécanique et Génie Civil in Montpellier.

Since 2017 he is the speaker of the Spezialforschungsbereich F65 Taming Complexity in Partial Differential Systems funded by the Austrian Science Fund.

== Awards ==
- Vinti Prize of the Unione Matematica Italiana (2015)
- Richard von Mises Prize of the GAMM (2010)
- Friedrich Wilhelm Bessel-Forschungspreis of the Alexander von Humboldt Foundation (2009)
- ERC Starting Grant (2007)

== Selected publications ==
- Mainini, Edoardo; Stefanelli, Ulisse (2014-06-01). "Crystallization in Carbon Nanostructures". Communications in Mathematical Physics. 328 (2): 545–571. Bibcode:2014CMaPh.328..545M. doi:10.1007/s00220-014-1981-5. ISSN 1432-0916. S2CID 253744289.
- Mielke, Alexander; Stefanelli, Ulisse (2011-01-01). "Weighted energy-dissipation functionals for gradient flows". ESAIM: Control, Optimisation and Calculus of Variations. 17 (1): 52–85. doi:10.1051/cocv/2009043. ISSN 1292-8119.
- Auricchio, F.; Reali, A.; Stefanelli, U. (2009-04-15). "A macroscopic 1D model for shape memory alloys including asymmetric behaviors and transformation-dependent elastic properties". Computer Methods in Applied Mechanics and Engineering. 198 (17): 1631–1637. Bibcode:2009CMAME.198.1631A. doi:10.1016/j.cma.2009.01.019. ISSN 0045-7825.
- Caffarelli, Luis A.; Stefanelli, Ulisse (2008-07-03). "A Counterexample to C 2,1 Regularity for Parabolic Fully Nonlinear Equations". Communications in Partial Differential Equations. 33 (7): 1216–1234. arXiv:math/0701769. doi:10.1080/03605300701518240. ISSN 0360-5302. S2CID 15798910.
- Mielke, Alexander; Roubíček, Tomáš; Stefanelli, Ulisse (2008-03-01). "Γ-limits and relaxations for rate-independent evolutionary problems". Calculus of Variations and Partial Differential Equations. 31 (3): 387–416. doi:10.1007/s00526-007-0119-4. ISSN 1432-0835. S2CID 55568258.
- Stefanelli, Ulisse (2008-01-01). "The Brezis–Ekeland Principle for Doubly Nonlinear Equations". SIAM Journal on Control and Optimization. 47 (3): 1615–1642. doi:10.1137/070684574. ISSN 0363-0129.
- Auricchio, Ferdinando; Mielke, Alexander; Stefanelli, Ulisse (2008-01-01). "A rate-independent model for the isothermal quasi-static evolution of shape-memory materials". Mathematical Models and Methods in Applied Sciences. 18 (1): 125–164. arXiv:0708.4378. doi:10.1142/S0218202508002632. ISSN 0218-2025. S2CID 17499836.
- Auricchio, F.; Reali, A.; Stefanelli, U. (2007-02-01). "A three-dimensional model describing stress-induced solid phase transformation with permanent inelasticity". International Journal of Plasticity. 23 (2): 207–226. doi:10.1016/j.ijplas.2006.02.012. ISSN 0749-6419.
