= Gårding's inequality =

In mathematics, Gårding's inequality is a result that gives a lower bound for the bilinear form induced by a real linear elliptic partial differential operator. The inequality is named after Lars Gårding.

== Statement of the inequality ==
Let $\Omega$ be a bounded, open domain in $n$-dimensional Euclidean space and let $H^k(\Omega)$ denote the Sobolev space of $k$-times weakly differentiable functions $u\colon\Omega\rightarrow\mathbb{R}$ with weak derivatives in $L^2(\Omega)$. Assume that $\Omega$ satisfies the $k$-extension property, i.e., that there exists a bounded linear operator $E\colon H^k(\Omega)\rightarrow H^k(\mathbb{R}^n)$ such that $Eu\vert_\Omega=u$ for all $u\in H^k(\Omega)$.

Let L be a linear partial differential operator of even order 2k, written in divergence form

$$(L u)(x) = \sum_{0 \leq | \alpha |, | \beta | \leq k} (-1)^{| \alpha |} \mathrm{D}^{\alpha} \left( A_{\alpha \beta} (x) \mathrm{D}^{\beta} u(x) \right),$$

and suppose that L is uniformly elliptic, i.e., there exists a constant θ > 0 such that

$$\sum_{| \alpha |, | \beta | = k} \xi^{\alpha} A_{\alpha \beta} (x) \xi^{\beta} > \theta | \xi |^{2 k} \mbox{ for all } x \in \Omega, \xi \in \mathbb{R}^{n} \setminus \{ 0 \}.$$

Finally, suppose that the coefficients A_{αβ} are bounded, continuous functions on the closure of Ω for |α| = |β| = k and that

$$A_{\alpha \beta} \in L^{\infty} (\Omega) \mbox{ for all } | \alpha |, | \beta | \leq k.$$

Then Gårding's inequality holds: there exist constants C > 0 and G ≥ 0

$$B[u, u] + G \| u \|_{L^{2} (\Omega)}^{2} \geq C \| u \|_{H^{k} (\Omega)}^{2} \mbox{ for all } u \in H_{0}^{k} (\Omega),$$

where

$$B[v, u] = \sum_{0 \leq | \alpha |, | \beta | \leq k} \int_{\Omega} A_{\alpha \beta} (x) \mathrm{D}^{\alpha} u(x) \mathrm{D}^{\beta} v(x) \, \mathrm{d} x$$

is the bilinear form associated to the operator L.

== Application: the Laplace operator and the Poisson problem ==
Be careful, in this application, Garding's Inequality seems useless here as the final result is a direct consequence of Poincaré's Inequality, or Friedrich Inequality. (See talk on the article).

As a simple example, consider the Laplace operator Δ. More specifically, suppose that one wishes to solve, for f ∈ L^{2}(Ω) the Poisson equation

$$\begin{cases} - \Delta u(x) = f(x), & x \in \Omega; \\ u(x) = 0, & x \in \partial \Omega; \end{cases}$$

where Ω is a bounded Lipschitz domain in R^{n}. The corresponding weak form of the problem is to find u in the Sobolev space H_{0}^{1}(Ω) such that

$$B[u, v] = \langle f, v \rangle \mbox{ for all } v \in H_{0}^{1} (\Omega),$$

where

$$B[u, v] = \int_{\Omega} \nabla u(x) \cdot \nabla v(x) \, \mathrm{d} x,$$
$$\langle f, v \rangle = \int_{\Omega} f(x) v(x) \, \mathrm{d} x.$$

The Lax–Milgram lemma ensures that if the bilinear form B is both continuous and elliptic with respect to the norm on H_{0}^{1}(Ω), then, for each f ∈ L^{2}(Ω), a unique solution u must exist in H_{0}^{1}(Ω). The hypotheses of Gårding's inequality are easy to verify for the Laplace operator Δ, so there exist constants C and G ≥ 0

$$B[u, u] \geq C \| u \|_{H^{1} (\Omega)}^{2} - G \| u \|_{L^{2} (\Omega)}^{2}  \mbox{ for all } u \in H_{0}^{1} (\Omega).$$

Applying the Poincaré inequality allows the two terms on the right-hand side to be combined, yielding a new constant K > 0 with

$$B[u, u] \geq K \| u \|_{H^{1} (\Omega)}^{2} \mbox{ for all } u \in H_{0}^{1} (\Omega),$$

which is precisely the statement that B is elliptic. The continuity of B is even easier to see: simply apply the Cauchy–Schwarz inequality and the fact that the Sobolev norm is controlled by the L^{2} norm of the gradient.
