= Gårding domain =

In mathematics, a Gårding domain is a concept in the representation theory of topological groups. The concept is named after the mathematician Lars Gårding.

Let G be a topological group and let U be a strongly continuous unitary representation of G in a separable Hilbert space H. Denote by g the family of all one-parameter subgroups of G. For each δ = { δ(t) | t ∈ R } ∈ g, let U(δ) denote the self-adjoint generator of the unitary one-parameter subgroup { U(δ(t)) | t ∈ R }. A Gårding domain for U is a linear subspace of H that is U(g)- and U(δ)-invariant for all g ∈ G and δ ∈ g and is also a domain of essential self-adjointness for U

Gårding showed in 1947 that, if G is a Lie group, then a Gårding domain for U consisting of infinitely differentiable vectors exists for each continuous unitary representation of G. In 1961, Kats extended this result to arbitrary locally compact topological groups. However, these results do not extend easily to the non-locally compact case because of the lack of a Haar measure on the group. In 1996, Danilenko proved the following result for groups G that can be written as the inductive limit of an increasing sequence G_{1} ⊆ G_{2} ⊆ ... of locally compact second countable subgroups:

Let U be a strongly continuous unitary representation of G in a separable Hilbert space H. Then there exist a separable nuclear Montel space F and a continuous, bijective, linear map J : F → H such that

- the dual space of F, denoted by F^{∗}, has the structure of a separable Fréchet space with respect to the strong topology on the dual pairing (F^{∗}, F);
- the image of J, im(J), is dense in H;
- for all g ∈ G, U(g)(im(J)) = im(J);
- for all δ ∈ g, U(δ)(im(J)) ⊆ im(J) and im(J) is a domain of essential self-adjointness for U(δ);
- for all g ∈ G, J^{−1}U(g)J is a continuous linear map from F to itself;
- moreover, the map G → Lin(F; F) taking g to J^{−1}U(g)J is continuous with respect to the topology on G and the weak operator topology on Lin(F; F).

The space F is known as a strong Gårding space for U and im(J) is called a strong Gårding domain for U. Under the above assumptions on G there is a natural Lie algebra structure on G, so it makes sense to call g the Lie algebra of G.
