= Maurizio Cornalba =

Italian mathematician

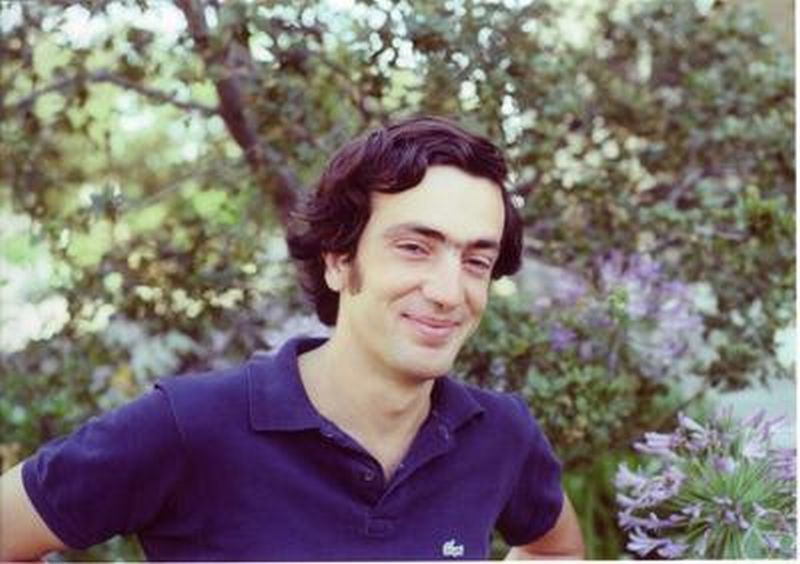
Maurizio Cornalba, Berkeley 1975

Maurizio Cornalba (born 17 January 1947) is an Italian mathematician, specializing in algebraic geometry.

Cornalba completed his undergraduate studies at University of Pisa in 1969 and his graduate studies at the Scuola Normale Superiore di Pisa in 1970. He was a postdoc at Princeton University from 1970 to 1971 and an assistant professor at the University of Pisa from 1971 to 1976; he was on leave of absence for the academic year 1971–1972 at Princeton University, for the academic year 1974–1975 at Harvard University, and for the academic year 1975–1976 at the University of California, Berkeley. At the University of Pavia he was a full professor from 1976 to 2017, when he retired as professor emeritus.

Cornalba's research deals with the geometry of algebraic curves and the geometry and topology of moduli spaces.

He was in 1993/94, 2005 and 2007 at the Institute for Advanced Study, in 1995 at the Institut Henri Poincaré, in 1998 at the University of Amsterdam, and in 1984/85 at Brown University.

In 1975 he received the Bartolozzi Prize. He is a member of the Accademia dei Lincei (elected in 1990 a corresponding member and in 2005 a full member), the Istituto Lombardo Accademia di Scienze e Lettere (elected in 2000), and the Accademia delle Scienze di Torino (elected in 2011).

In 1998 he was an Invited Speaker with talk Cohomology of Moduli Spaces of Stable Curves at the International Congress of Mathematicians in Berlin.

He was one of the co-authors for Guido Castelnuovo's Opere matematiche: memorie e note, published in 4 volumes by the Accademia Nazionale dei Lincei from 2002 to 2007, and for Phillip Griffiths's Selected works, published in 4 volumes by the American Mathematical Society in 2003.

== Selected publications ==
- with Enrico Arbarello, Phillip Griffiths, Joe Harris Geometry of algebraic curves, Grundlehren der mathematischen Wissenschaften, Springer Verlag, 2 vols., 1985, 2011; Vol. 1, 2013 pbk reprint; Vol. 2, 2011 pbk edition
- with E. Arbarello, P. Griffiths, Joe Harris, Special divisors on algebraic curves, reprinted in Selected Works of Phillip Griffiths, vol. 2, American Mathematical Society 2003, pp. 649–778 (Lecture notes, Regional Algebraic Geometry Conference, Athens, Georgia, 1979)
- as editor with X. Gomez-Mont, A. Verjovsky Lectures on Riemann Surfaces (ICTP, Triest 1987), World Scientific 1989
- as editor with Fabrizio Catanese, Ciro Ciliberto Problems in the theory of surfaces and their classification, Symposia Mathematica 32, Academic Press, London, 1991.
