= Bartolozzi Prize =

Italian biennial mathematical prize

The Bartolozzi Prize is awarded by the Italian Mathematical Union every two years to a young Italian mathematician. The 2019 edition was reserved to female Italian mathematicians below the age of 40. The prize is entitled in the memory of the Italian mathematician Giuseppe Bartolozzi and is worth €3,000 (in 2019).

Further prizes of the Italian Mathematical Union are the Caccioppoli Prize and the Stampacchia Medal.

== Prize winners ==
Source: Italian Mathematical Union

Winners and relative academic affiliations at the time of the awarding of the prize

- 1969 Giuseppe Da Prato (Sapienza University of Rome)
- 1971 Giorgio Talenti (University of Florence)
- 1973 Sergio Spagnolo (University of Pisa)
- 1975 Maurizio Cornalba (University of Pisa)
- 1977 Rosario Strano (University of Catania)
- 1979 Mariano Giaquinta (University of Florence)
- 1981 Angelo Marcello Anile (University of Catania)
- 1983 Fabrizio Catanese (University of Pisa)
- 1985 Daniele C. Struppa (Scuola Normale Superiore di Pisa)
- 1987 Alessandra Lunardi (University of Pisa)
- 1989 Marco Abate (Scuola Normale Superiore di Pisa)
- 1991 Luigi Ambrosio (University of Rome Tor Vergata)
- 1993 Stefano Demichelis (University of California, San Diego)
- 1995 Francesco Amoroso (University of Pisa)
- 1997 Lucia Caporaso (Harvard University)
- 1999 Marco Manetti (Scuola Normale Superiore di Pisa)
- 2001 Giovanni Leoni (Carnegie Mellon University)
- 2003 Carlo Maria Mantegazza (Scuola Normale Superiore di Pisa)
- 2005 Giuseppe Mingione (University of Parma)
- 2007 Annalisa Buffa (IMATI, Pavia)
- 2009 Valentino Tosatti (Columbia University)
- 2011 not assigned
- 2013 Gianluca Crippa (University of Basel)
- 2015 Emanuele Spadaro (Max-Planck-Institut für Mathematik in den Naturwissenschaften Leipzig)
- 2017 Andrea Mondino (University of Warwick)
- 2019 Maria Colombo (École Polytechnique Fédérale de Lausanne)
- 2021 Serena Dipierro (University of Western Australia)
- 2023 Cristiana De Filippis (University of Parma) and Eleonora Di Nezza (Sorbonne University).
- 2025 Mikaela Iacobelli (ETH Zürich)

== See also ==
- List of mathematics awards
- List of prizes named after people
