= Luigi Berzolari =

Italian mathematician (1863–1945)

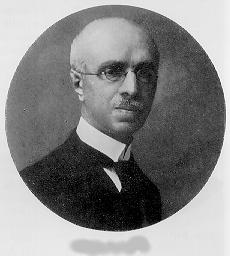
- Born: 1 May 1863; Naples, Italy
- Died: 10 December 1949 (aged 86)
- Education: University of Pavia
- Spouse: Elisa Citterio
- Parent(s): Angelo Berzolari and Rosa Rossi
- Scientific career
- Fields: Mathematics
- Workplaces: University of Pavia
- Thesis: Sulla superficie del quarto ordine avente una conica doppia (1884)

Luigi Berzolari (1863–1945) was an Italian mathematician.

== Life and work ==
The son of an infantry officer, Berzolari studied at Pavia, under professor Salvatore Pincherle. From 1880 to 1884 he studied at the University of Pavia, where he graduated in mathematics. He subsequently taught at high schools in Pavia and Vigevano, keeping in touch with Pavia's university as an assistant docent. In 1888 he obtained the venia legendi, and in 1892 the university's venia legendi.

In 1893 he obtained the chair of projective geometry at University of Torino, from which he was transferred to the chair of algebraic analysis in the university of Pavia in 1899. He remained in that position until he retired in 1935, except during 1924-1925, when he taught at the University of Milano. In Pavia, he was dean of the faculty of sciences and the university's rector from 1909-1913 and 1920-1922.

He was president of the Unione Matematica Italiana and the Istituto Lombardo Accademia di Scienze e Lettere.

Berzolari is remembered as chief editor of the Enciclopedia delle matematiche elementari, a seven-volume encyclopedia devoted to mathematics, published between 1930 and 1953, edited by the Unione and which editorial direction was committed to Berzolari in 1909.

== Bibliography ==
- Brusotti, Luigi (1950). "Necrologio di Luigi Berzolari con un elenco dell pubblicazioni" (PDF). Bolletino della Unione Matematica Italiana (in Italian). 5 (1): 1–19. ISSN 1972-6724.
- Marchisotto, Elena Anne; Smith, James (2007). The Legacy of Mario Pieri in Geometry and Arithmetic. Birkhäuser. ISBN 978-0-8176-3210-6.
- Monteiro de Siqueira, Rogerio (2015). "Editing geometries: The geometry volumes in Klein's encyclopedia". Circumscribere. 15: 35–47. ISSN 1980-7651.
