= Enrico Giusti =

Italian mathematician (1940–2024)

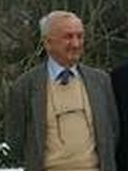
- Giusti in 2003
- Born: 28 October 1940; Priverno, Italy
- Died: 26 March 2024 (aged 83); Florence, Italy
- Education: Università di Firenze
- Known for: Calculus of variations, Regularity theory, Minimal Surfaces
- Awards: Caccioppoli Prize (1978)
- Scientific career
- Fields: Calculus of variations, Partial differential equations
- Workplaces: Università di Firenze

Signature
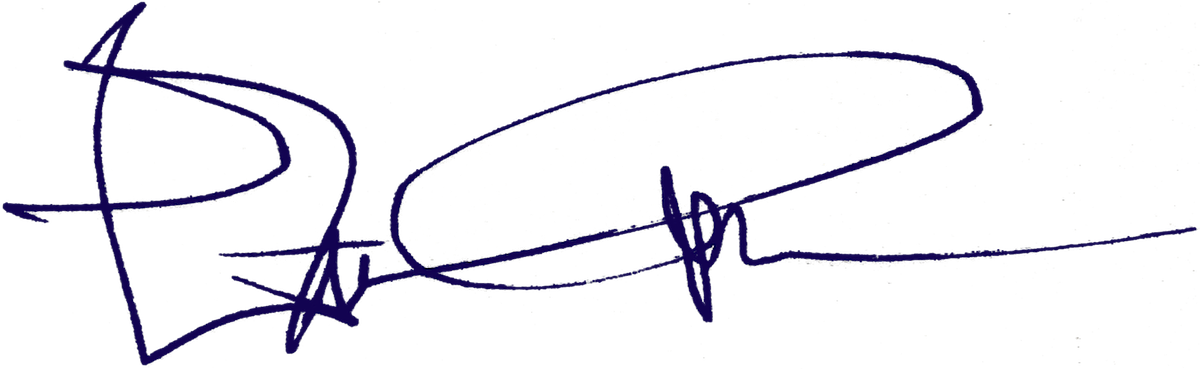

Enrico Giusti (28 October 1940 – 26 March 2024) was an Italian mathematician mainly known for his contributions to the fields of calculus of variations, regularity theory of partial differential equations, minimal surfaces and history of mathematics. He was professor of mathematics at the Università di Firenze; he also taught and conducted research at the Australian National University at Canberra, at the Stanford University and at the University of California, Berkeley. After retirement, he devoted himself to the managing of the "Giardino di Archimede", a museum entirely dedicated to mathematics and its applications. Giusti was also the editor-in-chief of the international journal dedicated to the history of mathematics Bollettino di storia delle scienze matematiche (Bulletin of the history of the mathematical sciences).

One of Giusti's most famous results, obtained with Enrico Bombieri and Ennio De Giorgi, concerned the minimality of Simons' cones, and made it possible to disprove the validity of Bernstein's theorem in dimensions larger than 8. The work on minimal surfaces was mentioned in the citation of the Fields Medal, eventually awarded to Bombieri in 1974.

Giusti had a sustained interest in the history of mathematics, e.g. the mathematics of Pierre de Fermat (see Giusti 2009). At the time of his death, he was the director of the Garden of Archimedes, a museum devoted to mathematics in Florence, Italy.

Giusti died in Florence on 26 March 2024, at the age of 83.

== Awards ==
Giusti won the Caccioppoli Prize of the Italian Mathematical Union in 1978 and in 2003 was awarded the national medal for mathematics by the Accademia Nazionale delle Scienze (dei XL).

== Selected publications ==
- "Minimal cones and the Bernstein problem" (with E. Bombieri and E. De Giorgi), Inventiones Mathematicae 7 (1969) 243–268
- "Harnack's inequality for elliptic differential equations on minimal surfaces" (with E. Bombieri), Inventiones Mathematicae 15 (1972), 24–46
- Giusti, Enrico (1977), Minimal surfaces and functions of bounded variation, Notes on Pure Mathematics, vol. 10, Canberra: Department of Pure Mathematics, Australian National University, pp. XI+185, ISBN 0-7081-1294-3, MR 0638362, Zbl 0402.49033
- Giusti, Enrico (1984), Minimal surfaces and functions of bounded variations, Monographs in Mathematics, vol. 80, Basel-Boston-Stuttgart: Birkhäuser Verlag, pp. XII+240, doi:10.1007/978-1-4684-9486-0, ISBN 978-0-8176-3153-6, MR 0775682, Zbl 0545.49018.
- "On the equation of surfaces of prescribed mean curvature. Existence and uniqueness without boundary conditions", Inventiones Mathematicae 46 (1978), 111–137
- "On the regularity of the minima of variational integrals" (with M. Giaquinta), Acta Mathematica 148 (1982), 31–46
- "Differentiability of minima of nondifferentiable functionals" (with M. Giaquinta), Inventiones Mathematicae 72 (1983), 285–298
- "The singular set of the minima of certain quadratic functionals" (with M. Giaquinta), Annali della Scuola Normale Superiore di Pisa Classe di Scienze (Serie 4) 11 (1984), 45–55.
- Giusti, Enrico (1994), Metodi diretti nel calcolo delle variazioni, Monografie Matematiche (in Italian), Bologna: Unione Matematica Italiana, pp. VI+422, MR 1707291, Zbl 0942.49002, translated in English as Giusti, Enrico (2003), Direct Methods in the Calculus of Variations, River Edge, NJ–London–Singapore: World Scientific Publishing, pp. viii+403, doi:10.1142/9789812795557, ISBN 981-238-043-4, MR 1962933, Zbl 1028.49001.
- Giusti, Enrico, Les méthodes des maxima et minima de Fermat. Ann. Fac. Sci. Toulouse Math. (6) 18 (2009), Fascicule Spécial, 59–85.

== See also ==
- Hilbert's nineteenth problem
- Plateau's problem
