= Ciro Ciliberto =

Italian mathematician (born 1950)

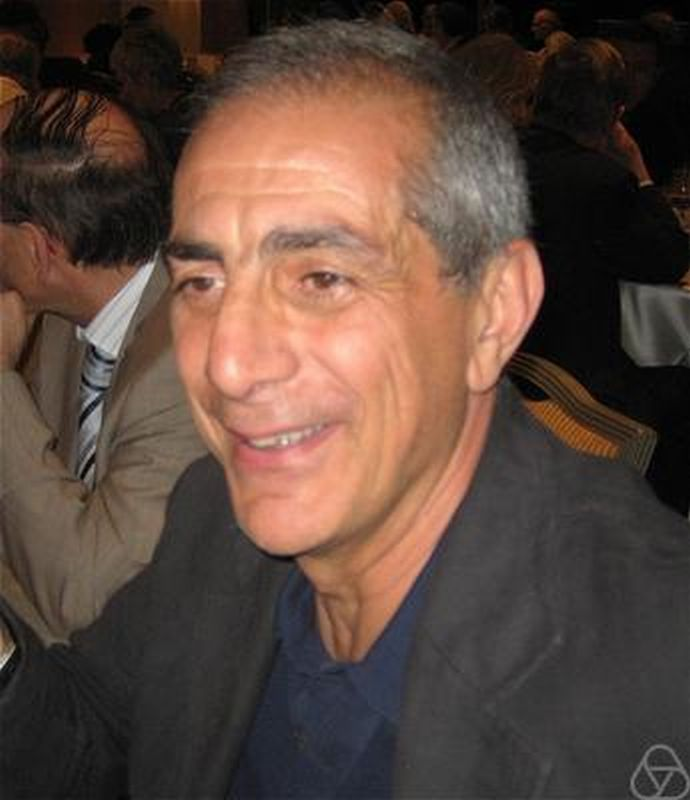
- Ciliberto in 2008
- Born: 14 October 1950 (age 75); Naples
- Education: University of Naples Federico II
- Scientific career
- Fields: Mathematics
- Workplaces: University of Naples Federico II; University of Lecce; University of Rome Tor Vergata; Istituto Nazionale di Alta Matematica Francesco Severi; Accademia Nazionale dei Lincei; Unione Matematica Italiana; Ministry of Education, University and Research (MIUR); Agenzia Nazionale di Valutazione del Sistema Universitario e della Ricerca (ANVUR); European Mathematical Society
- Website: https://www.mat.uniroma2.it/~cilibert/

Ciro Ciliberto (born 14 October 1950, in Naples) is an Italian mathematician.

== Career ==
Ciliberto graduated in Mathematics at the University of Naples Federico II in 1973. Assistant professor at the University of Naples Federico II from 1974 to 1980. Professor of Mathematics at the University of Naples Federico II since 1977 to 1978 and of Algebraic Geometry from 1978 to 1980. Extraordinary professor of Higher Mathematics at the University of Lecce in 1980-1981. Subsequently he was first extraordinary and then full professor of Algebraic Geometry at the University of Naples Federico II from 1981 to 1985. Then he was professor of Higher Geometry (Geometria Superiore) at the University of Rome Tor Vergata. Ciliberto was Vice-President of the Istituto Nazionale di Alta Matematica Francesco Severi in the years 1990-1995 and member of the Scientific Commission of the same Institute from 1995 to 1999. Ciliberto was Director of the PhD in Mathematics at the University of Rome Tor Vergata in the years 1990-1994, and subsequently member of the scientific committee of that faculty at the University of Rome Tor Vergata. Detached Professor at the "B. Segre Interdisciplinary Center" of the Accademia Nazionale dei Lincei in the years 1993-1996. Ciliberto was Member of various evaluation committees for national research projects for the Ministry of Education, University and Research (MIUR) in the years 1987-1997 and 2000-2003. Ciliberto was President of the Italian Mathematical Union from 2012 to 2018. Ciliberto was Member of the Advisory Committee of the Agenzia Nazionale di Valutazione del Sistema Universitario e della Ricerca (ANVUR) from 2011 to 2015. Ciliberto was Member of the Meetings Committee of the European Mathematical Society since 2013 and President of the Meetings Committee of the European Mathematical Society since 2018. Ciliberto is Member of Accademia Nazionale dei Lincei.

== Publications ==
- List of papers
