= Hypoelliptic operator =

Partial differential operator

In the theory of partial differential equations, a partial differential operator $P$ defined on an open subset

$$U \subset{\mathbb{R}}^n$$

is called hypoelliptic if for every distribution $u$ defined on an open subset $V \subset U$ such that $Pu$ is $C^\infty$ (smooth), $u$ must also be $C^\infty$.

If this assertion holds with $C^\infty$ replaced by real-analytic, then $P$ is said to be analytically hypoelliptic.

Every elliptic operator with $C^\infty$ coefficients is hypoelliptic. In particular, the Laplacian is an example of a hypoelliptic operator (the Laplacian is also analytically hypoelliptic). In addition, the operator for the heat equation ($P(u)=u_t - k\,\Delta u\,$)

$$P= \partial_t - k\,\Delta_x\,$$

(where $k>0$) is hypoelliptic but not elliptic. However, the operator for the wave equation ($P(u)=u_{tt} - c^2\,\Delta u\,$)

$$P= \partial^2_t - c^2\,\Delta_x\,$$

(where $c\ne 0$) is not hypoelliptic.
