= Joseph DeFilippis =

American gay-rights and anti-poverty activist (born 1967)

Joseph Nicholas DeFilippis
- Citizenship: United States
- Education: Vassar College; Hunter College School of Social Work; Portland State University
- Occupation: Activist
- Years active: 1989–present
- Employer: Seattle University
- Known for: founded Queers for Economic Justice
- Awards: Union Square Award (2004) and CSWE Minority Fellowship Award (2010)

Joseph DeFilippis (born 1967) is an American gay-rights and anti-poverty activist, who has served as executive director of two non-profit organizations and worked as a teacher, community organizer and public speaker. He is best known as the founder of Queers for Economic Justice.

== Early life ==
DeFilippis was born and raised in Queens in New York City, the biracial son of two immigrants. He graduated from Vassar College in 1989 and obtained a Masters in Social Work in 1999 from Hunter College School of Social Work.

== Career ==
DeFilippis is a professor at Seattle University, and the author of numerous scholarly articles and books. From 1999 to 2003, DeFilippis served as the Director of SAGE/Queens, a non-profit serving gay and lesbian senior citizens. He was the LGBT Liaison for the County of Westchester, where he worked to expand outreach to LGBTQ people of color and low-income LGBTQ people. DeFilippis abruptly left the liaison position after a few months.

In 2003, DeFilippis founded Queers for Economic Justice, a non-profit organization in New York City that works with low-income lesbian, gay, bisexual and transgender people. DeFilippis was its first executive director from 2003 to 2009, during which time he built the organization from a volunteer organization into a nationally recognized non-profit organization, with programs working on issues such as homelessness, welfare, immigration and others.

Under his leadership, Queers for Economic Justice succeeded in changing various NYC laws and policies impacting homeless transgender people and homeless domestic partners. Other founders or board members of QEJ include seasoned LGBTQ activists Terry Boggis, Kenyon Farrow, Felix Gardon, Monroe France, Reina Gossett(Tourmaline), Amber Hollibaugh, Ignacio Rivera, Jessica Stern, and Jay Toole; anti-poverty activists Ricky Blum, Aine Duggan and Maureen Lane; and noted scholars and authors Ann Cammett, Martin Duberman, Lisa Duggan, Richard Kim and Dean Spade.

Queers for Economic Justice was born out of the work of the Queer Economic Justice Network, a coalition of dozens of anti-poverty and gay rights organizations that DeFilippis founded and coordinated from 1999 to 2003. The Queer Economic Justice Network primarily focused on the impact of the welfare reforms of 1996 on LGBTQ people, but also addressed other progressive causes. During this same period he also served on the Steering Committee of the Welfare Reform Network, a coalition of welfare rights organizations in New York City.

He has taught at Seattle University since 2015 in the Department of Anthropology, Sociology, and Social Work.

== Controversies ==
During his tenure at Queers for Economic Justice, DeFilippis spearheaded the development and release of a document called Beyond Same-Sex Marriage: A New Strategic Vision For All Our Families and Relationships. The document was organized by QEJ, drafted by DeFilippis and over a dozen leaders in the LGBTQ community, and signed by hundreds of other activists, including notable gay figures such as Armistead Maupin and Judith Butler, as well as such heterosexual liberal leaders Gloria Steinem, Cornel West, and Barbara Ehrenreich. Beyond Same-Sex Marriage criticized the gay marriage movement as being too narrow and called for a broader definition of family, beyond conjugal relationships, to recognize the numerous configurations of family found in the U.S.

It generated a lot of media coverage in both the gay press and mainstream media, including the New York Times and Newsweek. DeFilippis was one of the spokespeople of the document and appeared frequently in the news criticizing the strategies and leaders of the marriage equality movement. Conservative writers who disagreed with the document's goals criticized DeFilippis and Beyond Marriage, as did leaders of the marriage equality movement such as Evan Wolfson.

DeFilippis has been involved in other controversies as well. In 2001, mere weeks after the 9/11 attacks, DeFilippis was one of the most vocal anti-war leaders in the LGBTQ community, putting him at odds with many other LGBTQ leaders.

In 2006, DeFilippis was one of the authors of an Open Letter to the Advocate magazine, where prominent leaders in the LGBTQ community challenged the pitting of gay rights against immigration rights.

Under DeFilippis' leadership, Queers for Economic Justice was also outspoken in criticizing other aspects of the gay rights movement. QEJ and DeFilippis regularly criticized the national gay rights organizations for failing to address poverty in the LGBTQ community.

DeFilippis and QEJ also disagreed with the gay rights movement's emphasis on hate crimes legislation, arguing that the criminal justice system was racist and an inappropriate place to seek solutions to hate crimes. For those reasons, in 2009, while still under DeFilippis' leadership, QEJ was one of five organizations to voice opposition to the New York State Gender Employment Non-Discrimination Act (GENDA).

== Personal life ==
DeFilippis had a long-term partner, playwright David Koteles. He earned a Ph.D. in social work at Portland State University.

DeFilippis has taught graduate-level courses in Political Economy, Welfare Policy, Community Organizing, and Social Justice at Hunter College School of Social Work and Fordham University and undergraduate sexuality courses at Portland State University. He is currently a professor at Seattle University.

DeFilippis received the Union Square Award in 2004 and the Council on Social Work Education's Minority Fellowship in 2010.
