= Elliptic operator =

Type of differential operator

A solution to Laplace's equation defined on an annulus. The Laplace operator is the most famous example of an elliptic operator.

In the theory of partial differential equations, elliptic operators are differential operators that generalize the Laplace operator. They are defined by the condition that the coefficients of the highest-order derivatives be positive, which implies the key property that the principal symbol is invertible, or equivalently that there are no real characteristic directions.

Elliptic operators are typical of potential theory, and they appear frequently in electrostatics and continuum mechanics. Elliptic regularity implies that their solutions tend to be smooth functions (if the coefficients in the operator are smooth). Steady-state solutions to hyperbolic and parabolic equations generally solve elliptic equations.

== Definitions ==
Let $L$ be a linear differential operator of order m on a domain $\Omega$ in R^{n} given by
$$Lu = \sum_{|\alpha| \le m} a_\alpha(x)\partial^\alpha u$$
where $\alpha = (\alpha_1, \dots, \alpha_n)$ denotes a multi-index, and $\partial^\alpha u = \partial^{\alpha_1}_1 \cdots \partial_n^{\alpha_n}u$ denotes the partial derivative of order $\alpha_i$ in $x_i$.

Then $L$ is called elliptic if for every x in $\Omega$ and every non-zero $\xi$ in R^{n},
$$\sum_{|\alpha| = m} a_\alpha(x)\xi^\alpha \neq 0,$$
where $\xi^\alpha = \xi_1^{\alpha_1} \cdots \xi_n^{\alpha_n}$.

In many applications, this condition is not strong enough, and instead a uniform ellipticity condition may be imposed for operators of order m = 2k:
$$(-1)^k\sum_{|\alpha| = 2k} a_\alpha(x) \xi^\alpha > C |\xi|^{2k},$$
where C is a positive constant. Note that ellipticity only depends on the highest-order terms.

A nonlinear operator
$$L(u) = F\left(x, u, \left(\partial^\alpha u\right)_{|\alpha| \le m}\right)$$
is elliptic if its linearization is; i.e. the first-order Taylor expansion with respect to u and its derivatives about any point is an elliptic operator.

Example 1
The negative of the Laplacian in R^{d} given by
$$- \Delta u = - \sum_{i=1}^d \partial_i^2 u$$
is a uniformly elliptic operator. The Laplace operator occurs frequently in electrostatics. If ρ is the charge density within some region Ω of linear permittivity ɛ, the electrical potential Φ must satisfy the equation
$$- \Delta \Phi = \frac{\rho}{\varepsilon}.$$
This follows directly from the first of Maxwell's equations, Gauss' Law, and the definition of the potential as: $- \nabla \Phi = \boldsymbol E \,.$
Example 2
Given a matrix-valued function A(x) which is uniformly positive definite for every x, having components a^{ij}, the operator
$$Lu = -\partial_i\left(a^{ij}(x)\partial_ju\right) + b^j(x)\partial_ju + cu$$
is elliptic. This is the most general form of a second-order divergence form linear elliptic differential operator. The Laplace operator is obtained by taking A = I. These operators also occur in electrostatics in polarized media.
Example 3
For p a non-negative number, the p-Laplacian is a nonlinear elliptic operator defined by
$$L(u) = -\sum_{i = 1}^d\partial_i\left(|\nabla u|^{p - 2}\partial_i u\right).$$
A similar nonlinear operator occurs in glacier mechanics. The Cauchy stress tensor of ice, according to Glen's flow law, is given by
$$\tau_{ij} = B\left(\sum_{k,l = 1}^3\left(\partial_lu_k\right)^2\right)^{-\frac{1}{3}} \cdot \frac{1}{2} \left(\partial_ju_i + \partial_iu_j\right)$$
for some constant B. The velocity of an ice sheet in steady state will then solve the nonlinear elliptic system
$$\sum_{j = 1}^3\partial_j\tau_{ij} + \rho g_i - \partial_ip = Q,$$
where ρ is the ice density, g is the gravitational acceleration vector, p is the pressure and Q is a forcing term.

== Elliptic regularity theorems ==
Let L be an elliptic operator of order 2k with coefficients having 2k continuous derivatives. The Dirichlet problem for L is to find a function u, given a function f and some appropriate boundary values, such that Lu = f and such that u has the appropriate boundary values and normal derivatives. The existence theory for elliptic operators, using Gårding's inequality, Lax–Milgram lemma and Fredholm alternative, states the sufficient condition for a weak solution u to exist in the Sobolev space H^{k}.

For example, for a second-order elliptic operator as in Example 2,

- There is a number γ>0 such that for each μ>γ, each $f\in L^2(U)$, there exists a unique solution $u\in H_{0}^{1}(U)$ of the boundary value problem
  $Lu+\mu u=f \text{ in }U, u=0\text{ on }\partial U$, which is based on Lax-Milgram lemma.
- Either (a) for any $f\in L^2(U)$, $Lu=f \text{ in }U, u=0\text{ on }\partial U$ (1) has a unique solution, or (b)$Lu=0 \text{ in }U, u=0\text{ on }\partial U$ has a solution $u\not\equiv 0$, which is based on the property of compact operators and Fredholm alternative.

This situation is ultimately unsatisfactory, as the weak solution u might not have enough derivatives for the expression Lu to be well-defined in the classical sense.

The elliptic regularity theorem guarantees that, provided f is square-integrable, u will in fact have 2k square-integrable weak derivatives. In particular, if f is infinitely-often differentiable, then so is u.

For L as in Example 2,

- Interior regularity: If m is a natural number, $a^{ij},b^{j},c \in C^{m+1}(U), f\in H^{m}(U)$ (2) , $u\in H_{0}^{1}(U)$ is a weak solution to (1), then for any open set V in U with compact closure, $\|u\|_{H^{m+2}(V)}\le C(\|f\|_{H^{m}(U)}+\|u\|_{L^2(U)})$(3), where C depends on U, V, L, m, per se $u\in H_{loc}^{m+2}(U)$, which also holds if m is infinity by Sobolev embedding theorem.
- Boundary regularity: (2) together with the assumption that $\partial U$ is $C^{m+2}$ indicates that (3) still holds after replacing V with U, i.e. $u\in H^{m+2}(U)$, which also holds if m is infinity.

Any differential operator exhibiting this property is called a hypoelliptic operator; thus, every elliptic operator is hypoelliptic. The property also means that every fundamental solution of an elliptic operator is infinitely differentiable in any neighborhood not containing 0.

As an application, suppose a function $f$ satisfies the Cauchy–Riemann equations. Since the Cauchy-Riemann equations form an elliptic operator, it follows that $f$ is smooth.

== Properties ==
For L as in Example 2 on U, which is an open domain with C^{1} boundary, then there is a number γ>0 such that for each μ>γ, $L+\mu I: H_{0}^{1}(U)\rightarrow H_{0}^{1}(U)$ satisfies the assumptions of Lax–Milgram lemma.

- Invertibility: For each μ>γ, $L+\mu I:L^2(U)\rightarrow L^2(U)$ admits a compact inverse.
- Eigenvalues and eigenvectors: If A is symmetric, b^{i},c are zero, then (1) Eigenvalues of L, are real, positive, countable, unbounded (2) There is an orthonormal basis of L^{2}(U) composed of eigenvectors of L. (See Spectral theorem.)
- Generates a semigroup on L^{2}(U): −L generates a semigroup $\{S(t);t\geq 0\}$ of bounded linear operators on L^{2}(U) s.t. $\frac{d}{dt}S(t)u_0=-LS(t)u_0, \|S(t)\|\leq e^{\gamma t}$ in the norm of L^{2}(U), for every $u_0\in L^2(U)$, by Hille–Yosida theorem.

== General definition ==
Let $D$ be a (possibly nonlinear) differential operator between vector bundles of the same rank having fiberwise inner products. Take its principal symbol $\sigma_\xi(D)$ with respect to a one-form $\xi$. (Basically, what we are doing is replacing the highest order covariant derivatives by vector fields and evaluating against the one form $\xi$.)

We say $D$ is weakly elliptic if $\sigma_\xi(D)$ is a linear isomorphism for every non-zero $\xi$.

We say $D$ is (uniformly) strongly elliptic if for some constant $c > 0$,
$$||\sigma_\xi(D)(v)|| \geq c\|v\|$$

for all $\|\xi\|=1$ and all $v$.

The definition of ellipticity in the previous part of the article is strong ellipticity. Notice that the $\xi$ are covector fields or one-forms, but the $v$ are elements of the vector bundle upon which $D$ acts.

The quintessential example of a (strongly) elliptic operator is the Laplacian (or its negative, depending upon convention). It is not hard to see that $D$ needs to be of even order for strong ellipticity to even be an option. Otherwise, just consider plugging in both $\xi$ and its negative. On the other hand, a weakly elliptic first-order operator, such as the Dirac operator can square to become a strongly elliptic operator, such as the Laplacian. The composition of weakly elliptic operators is weakly elliptic.

Weak ellipticity is nevertheless strong enough for the Fredholm alternative, Schauder estimates, and the Atiyah–Singer index theorem. On the other hand, we need strong ellipticity for the maximum principle, and to guarantee that the eigenvalues are discrete, and their only limit point is infinity.

== See also ==
- Sobolev space
- Hypoelliptic operator
- Elliptic partial differential equation
- Hyperbolic partial differential equation
- Parabolic partial differential equation
- Hopf maximum principle
- Elliptic complex
- Ultrahyperbolic wave equation
- Semi-elliptic operator
- Weyl's lemma
