= Lars Gårding =

Swedish mathematician (1919–2014)

- Born: 7 March 1919; Hedemora, Sweden
- Died: 7 July 2014 (aged 95)
- Education: Lund University
- Known for: Work on partial differential equations Gårding–Wightman axioms Gårding domain Gårding's inequality Petrovsky lacuna
- Awards: Member of the Royal Swedish Academy of Sciences (1953)
- Scientific career
- Fields: Mathematics
- Workplaces: Lund University
- Thesis: On a Class of Linear Transformations Connected with Group Representations (1944)
- Doctoral advisor: Marcel Riesz
- Doctoral students: Lars Hörmander

Lars Gårding (7 March 1919 – 7 July 2014) was a Swedish mathematician. He made notable contributions to the study of partial differential equations and partial differential operators. He was a professor of mathematics at Lund University in Sweden from 1952 to 1984. Together with Marcel Riesz, he was a thesis advisor for Lars Hörmander. In physics, he is known for postulating the Gårding–Wightman axioms of quantum field theory.

== Biography ==
Gårding was born in Hedemora, Sweden but grew up in Motala, where his father was an engineer at the plant. He began to study mathematics in Lund in 1937, first with the intention of becoming an actuary.

His doctorate thesis, which was written under the supervision of Marcel Riesz, was first on group representations in 1944, but in the following years he changed his research focus to the theory of partial differential equations. He held the professorship of mathematics at Lund University from 1952 until retirement in 1984.

Gårding's interest was not limited to mathematics, but also in art, literature and music. He played the violin and the piano. He published a book on bird songs and calls in 1987, a result of his interest in birdwatching.

He was elected a member of the Royal Swedish Academy of Sciences in 1953 and of the Finnish Society of Sciences and Letters in 1985.

Gårding died on 7 July 2014, aged 95.

== Selected works ==
Books

- 1977. Encounter with Mathematics, 1st Edition.
- 2012. Encounter with Mathematics, softcover reprint of the 1st 1977 edition. Springer ISBN 978-1-4615-9641-7

Articles

- Atiyah, Michael Francis; Bott, Raoul; Gårding, Lars (1970), "Lacunas for hyperbolic differential operators with constant coefficients. I", Acta Mathematica, 124: 109–189, doi:10.1007/BF02394570, MR 0470499, Zbl 0191.11203
- Atiyah, Michael Francis; Bott, Raoul; Gårding, Lars (1973), "Lacunas for hyperbolic differential operators with constant coefficients. II", Acta Mathematica, 131: 145–206, doi:10.1007/BF02392039, MR 0470500
