= Eleonora Di Nezza =

Italian mathematician

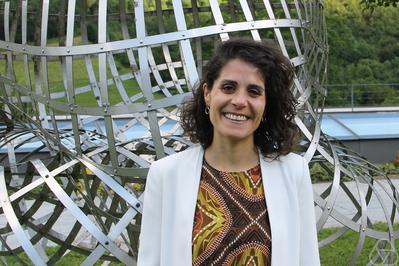
- Di Nezza at Oberwolfach in 2024
- Education: Sapienza
- Scientific career
- Workplaces: Ecole Polytechnique; CNRS; IHES; UC Berkeley; Imperial College
- Website: Personal website – Eleonora Di Nezza

Eleonora Di Nezza is an Italian mathematician, a CNRS researcher at the Centre de mathématiques Laurent-Schwartz and a professor of mathematics at Ecole Polytechnique, in Palaiseau, France. Her research is at the intersection of various branches of mathematics including complex and differential geometry, and focuses on Kähler geometry.

== Education and career ==
Di Nezza earned her master's degree in mathematics from the Sapienza University of Rome, and did her doctoral research between the University of Rome Tor Vergata and Paul Sabatier University in Toulouse, France, during which reunified results on fractional Sobolev spaces in collaboration with Giampiero Palatucci and Enrico Valdinoci. Her dissertation was on the Geometry of complex Monge-Ampère equations on compact Kähler manifolds.

After receiving her PhD, she became a postdoctoral fellow at Imperial College, in London, UK under a Marie Curie Fellowship, during which she joined the Mathematical Sciences Research Institute in Berkeley, United States. In 2017 she moved to France to join the Institute of Advanced Scientific Studies before becoming a lecturer at Sorbonne University and a professor of mathematics at Ecole Polytechnique.

== Recognition ==
She was awarded the CNRS Bronze Medal in 2021. She was the 2023 recipient of the Prix Reine-Elizabeth from the Pierre Le Conte Foundation of the French Academy of Sciences.

In 2023 she was named as a junior member to the Institut Universitaire de France.
