= Susanna Terracini =

Italian mathematician (born 1963)

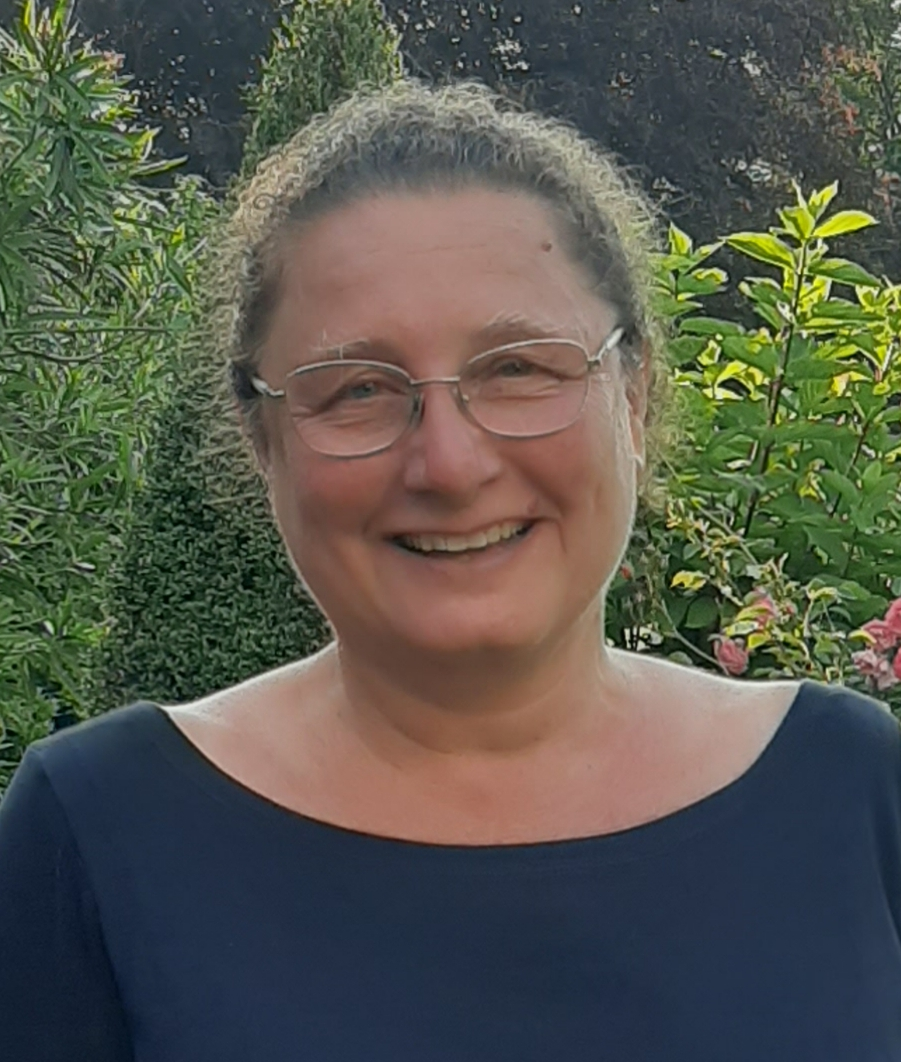
Terracini in 2020 or earlier

Susanna Terracini (Italian pronunciation: [suˈzanna terraˈtʃiːni]; born 29 April 1963) is an Italian mathematician known for her research on chaos in Hamiltonian dynamical systems, including the n-body problem, reaction–diffusion systems, and the Schrödinger equation.

== Life and career ==
Terracini was born in South London to a distant cousin of Italian anti-fascist politician Umberto Terracini. She earned a laurea in 1986 in mathematics at the University of Turin, supervised by Fulvia Skof. She completed her Ph.D. at the International School for Advanced Studies in 1990. Her dissertation, Periodic Solutions to Singular Newtonian Systems, was supervised by Ivar Ekeland and Sergio Solimini.

She was a researcher at Paris Dauphine University from 1988 to 1989, and became a faculty member at the Polytechnic University of Milan in 1990. In 2001 she became a full professor at the University of Milano-Bicocca, and in 2012 she returned to Turin as a professor. As of February 2026, Terracini is a member of the Scientific Advisory Board of the Barcelona Centre de Recerca Matemàtica.

== Awards and recognition ==
One of Terracini's papers on the n-body problem was selected for a featured review in Mathematical Reviews. She was the winner of the 2002 Vinti Prize, a prize of the Italian Mathematical Union for young researchers in mathematical analysis. In 2007 she won the Bruno Finzi Prize of the Istituto Lombardo Accademia di Scienze e Lettere. In 2020 she was awarded the Schauder Medal from the Juliusz P. Schauder Center for Nonlinear Studies at the Nicolaus Copernicus University in Toruń, Poland.

== Positions on other issues ==
In early 2024, amid Israel's war on Gaza, Terracini was the only member of the academic senate at Turin to vote against severing ties with Israeli institutions, declaring herself opposed to academic boycotts by principle and stating dialogue should always be favoured; she had previously opposed the suspension of agreements with Russian universities during the war on Ukraine. She later criticized student protesters for their vocal anti-Zionist stance which, according to her, was due to the blind adoption of a Hamas narrative.
