= Giuseppe Da Prato =

Italian academic and mathematician (1936–2023)

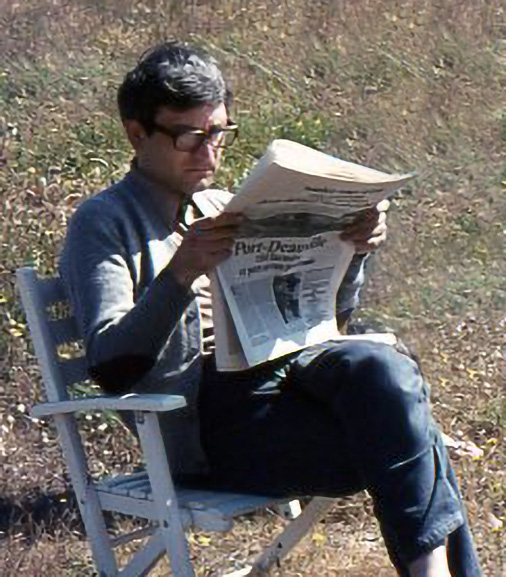
- Da Prato in 1976
- Born: 23 July 1936; La Spezia, Italy
- Died: 6 October 2023 (aged 87); Pisa, Italy
- Education: Sapienza University of Rome
- Occupations: Professor; Mathematician

Giuseppe Da Prato (23 July 1936 – 6 October 2023) was an Italian academic and mathematician. He taught at the Scuola Normale Superiore di Pisa. He mainly researched stochastic calculus, partial differential equations, and control theory.

== Biography ==
Born in La Spezia on 23 July 1936, Da Prato earned his doctorate at the Sapienza University of Rome in 1960 under the direction of Marcello Cini. In 1963, he became an assistant professor at the University of Pisa. He became a professor at the Sapienza in 1968 and won the Bartolozzi Prize the following year. He remained at the Sapienza until 1977, during which time he was also a guest professor at the Université Nice-Sophia-Antipolis in France. He worked at the University of Trento from 1977 to 1979, and subsequently joined the Scuola Normale Superiore, where he stayed for nearly 30 years. He was also a guest professor at the University of Maryland, College Park in the United States from 1981 to 1982.

Da Prato served on the editorial board of numerous mathematical journals. He also co-founded the journal Nonlinear Differential Equations and Applications.

Giuseppe Da Prato died on 6 October 2023, at the age of 87.
