= Parabolic partial differential equation =

Class of second-order linear partial differential equations

A parabolic partial differential equation is a type of partial differential equation (PDE). Parabolic PDEs are used to describe a wide variety of time-dependent phenomena in, for example, engineering science, quantum mechanics and financial mathematics. Examples include the heat equation, time-dependent Schrödinger equation and the Black–Scholes equation.

== Definition ==
To define the simplest kind of parabolic PDE, consider a real-valued function $u(x, y)$ of two independent real variables, $x$ and $y$. A second-order, linear, constant-coefficient PDE for $u$ takes the form

$$Au_{xx} + 2Bu_{xy} + Cu_{yy} + Du_x + Eu_y + F = 0,$$

where the subscripts denote the first- and second-order partial derivatives with respect to $x$ and $y$. The PDE is classified as parabolic if the coefficients of the principal part (i.e. the terms containing the second derivatives of $u$) satisfy the condition

$$B^2 - AC = 0.$$

Usually $x$ represents one-dimensional position and $y$ represents time, and the PDE is solved subject to prescribed initial and boundary conditions. Equations with $B^2 - AC < 0$ are termed elliptic while those with $B^2 - AC > 0$ are hyperbolic. The name "parabolic" is used because the assumption on the coefficients is the same as the condition for the analytic geometry equation $A x^2 + 2B xy + C y^2 + D x + E y + F = 0$ to define a planar parabola.

The basic example of a parabolic PDE is the one-dimensional heat equation

$$u_t = \alpha\,u_{xx},$$

where $u(x,t)$ is the temperature at position $x$ along a thin rod at time $t$ and $\alpha$ is a positive constant called the thermal diffusivity.

The heat equation says, roughly, that temperature at a given time and point rises or falls at a rate proportional to the difference between the temperature at that point and the average temperature near that point. The quantity $u_{xx}$ measures how far off the temperature is from satisfying the mean value property of harmonic functions.

The concept of a parabolic PDE can be generalized in several ways. For instance, the flow of heat through a material body is governed by the three-dimensional heat equation

$$u_t = \alpha\,\Delta u,$$

where

$$\Delta u := \frac{\partial^2u}{\partial x^2}+\frac{\partial^2u}{\partial y^2}+\frac{\partial^2u}{\partial z^2},$$

denotes the Laplace operator acting on $u$. This equation is the prototype of a multi-dimensional parabolic PDE.

Noting that $-\Delta$ is an elliptic operator suggests a broader definition of a parabolic PDE:

$$u_t = -Lu,$$

where $L$ is a second-order elliptic operator (implying that $L$ must be positive; a case where $u_t = +Lu$ is considered below).

A system of partial differential equations for a vector $u$ can also be parabolic. For example, such a system is hidden in an equation of the form

$$\nabla \cdot (a(x) \nabla u(x)) + b(x)^\text{T} \nabla u(x) + cu(x) = f(x)$$

if the matrix-valued function $a(x)$ has a kernel of dimension 1.

== Solution ==
Under broad assumptions, an initial/boundary-value problem for a linear parabolic PDE has a solution for all time. The solution $u(x,t)$, as a function of $x$ for a fixed time $t > 0$, is generally smoother than the initial data $u(x,0) = u_0(x)$, according to parabolic regularity theory.

For a nonlinear parabolic PDE, a solution of an initial/boundary-value problem might explode in a singularity within a finite amount of time. It can be difficult to determine whether a solution exists for all time, or to understand the singularities that do arise. Such interesting questions arise in the solution of the Poincaré conjecture via Ricci flow.

== Backward parabolic equation ==
One occasionally encounters a so-called backward parabolic PDE, which takes the form $u_t = Lu$ (note the absence of a minus sign).

An initial-value problem for the backward heat equation,

$$\begin{cases} u_{t} = -\Delta u & \textrm{on} \ \ \Omega \times (0,T), \\ u=0 & \textrm{on} \ \ \partial\Omega \times (0,T), \\ u = f & \textrm{on} \ \ \Omega \times \left \{ 0 \right \}. \end{cases}$$

is equivalent to a final-value problem for the ordinary heat equation,

$$\begin{cases} u_{t} = \Delta u & \textrm{on} \ \ \Omega \times (0,T), \\ u=0
& \textrm{on} \ \ \partial\Omega \times (0,T), \\ u = f & \textrm{on} \ \ \Omega \times \left \{ T \right \}. \end{cases}$$

Similarly to a final-value problem for a parabolic PDE, an initial-value problem for a backward parabolic PDE is usually not well-posed (solutions often grow unbounded in finite time, or even fail to exist). Nonetheless, these problems are important for the study of the reflection of singularities of solutions to various other PDEs.

== See also ==
- Elliptic partial differential equation
- Hyperbolic partial differential equation
