= Regularity theory =

On weak solutions of differential equations

Regularity is a topic of the mathematical study of partial differential equations (PDE) such as Laplace's equation, about the integrability and differentiability of weak solutions. Hilbert's nineteenth problem was concerned with this concept.

The motivation for this study is as follows. It is often difficult to construct a classical solution satisfying the PDE in regular sense, so we search for a weak solution at first, and then find out whether the weak solution is smooth enough to be qualified as a classical solution.

Several theorems have been proposed for different types of PDEs.

== Elliptic regularity theory ==
Let $U$ be an open, bounded subset of $\mathbb{R}^n$, denote its boundary as $\partial U$ and the variables as $x=(x_1,...,x_n)$. Representing the PDE as a partial differential operator $L$ acting on an unknown function $u=u(x)$ of $x\in U$ results in a BVP of the form
$$\left\{
\begin{align}
L u &= f & &\text{in } U\\
u &=0 & &\text{on } \partial U,
\end{align}\right.$$
where $f: U \rightarrow \mathbb{R}$ is a given function $f=f(x)$ and $u:U\cup \partial U \rightarrow \mathbb{R}$ and the elliptic operator $L$ is of the divergence form:
$$Lu(x)= - \sum_{i,j=1}^n (a_{ij} (x) u_{x_i})_{x_j} + \sum_{i=1}^n b_i(x) u_{x_i}(x) + c(x) u(x),$$
then

- Interior regularity: If m is a natural number, $a^{ij},b^{j},c \in C^{m+1}(U), f\in H^{m}(U)$ (2), $u\in H_{0}^{1}(U)$ is a weak solution, then for any open set V in U with compact closure, $\|u\|_{H^{m+2}(V)}\le C(\|f\|_{H^{m}(U)}+\|u\|_{L^2(U)})$(3), where C depends on U, V, L, m, per se $u\in H_{loc}^{m+2}(U)$, which also holds if m is infinity by Sobolev embedding theorem.
- Boundary regularity: (2) together with the assumption that $\partial U$ is $C^{m+2}$ indicates that (3) still holds after replacing V with U, i.e. $u\in H^{m+2}(U)$, which also holds if m is infinity.

== Parabolic and Hyperbolic regularity theory ==
Parabolic and hyperbolic PDEs describe the time evolution of a quantity u governed by an elliptic operator L and an external force f over a space $U\subset \mathbb{R}^n$. We assume the boundary of U to be smooth, and the elliptic operator to be independent of time, with smooth coefficients, i.e.
$$Lu(t,x)= - \sum_{i,j=1}^n \big(a_{ij} (x) u_{x_i}(t,x)\big)_{x_j} + \sum_{i=1}^n b_i(x) u_{x_i}(t,x) + c(x) u(t,x).$$
In addition, we subscribe the boundary value of u to be 0.

Then the regularity of the solution is given by the following table,

Equation	$u_t+Lu=f$ (parabolic)	$u_{tt}+Lu=f$ (hyperbolic)
Initial Condition	$u(0)\in H_{x}^{2m+1}$	$u(0)\in H_{x}^{m+1},\,(\partial_t u)(0)\in H_{x}^{m}$
External force	$\partial_{t}^k f\in L_t^2 H_{x}^{2(m-k)}\,(k=1,\dots m)$	$\partial_{t}^k f\in L_t^2 H_{x}^{m-k}\,(k=1,\dots m)$
Solution	$\partial_t^k u\in L_t^2 H_x^{2(m+1-k)},\,(k=1,\dots,m+1)$	$\partial_t^k u\in L_t^\infty H_x^{m+1-k},\,(k=1,\dots,m+1)$

where m is a natural number, $x\in U$ denotes the space variable, t denotes the time variable, H^{s} is a Sobolev space of functions with square-integrable weak derivatives, and L_{t}^{p}X is the Bochner space of integrable X-valued functions.

== Counterexamples ==
Not every weak solution is smooth; for example, there may be discontinuities in the weak solutions of conservation laws called shock waves.
