= Elliptic partial differential equation =

Class of partial differential equations

In mathematics, an elliptic partial differential equation is a type of partial differential equation (PDE). In mathematical modeling, elliptic PDEs are frequently used to model steady states, unlike parabolic and hyperbolic PDEs, which generally model phenomena that change in time. The canonical examples of elliptic PDEs are Laplace's equation and Poisson's equation. Elliptic PDEs are also important in pure mathematics, where they are fundamental to various fields of research such as differential geometry and optimal transport.

== Definition ==
Elliptic differential equations appear in many different contexts and levels of generality.

First consider a second-order linear PDE for an unknown function of two variables $u = u(x,y)$, written in the form
$$Au_{xx} + 2Bu_{xy} + Cu_{yy} + Du_x + Eu_y + Fu +G= 0,$$
where A, B, C, D, E, F, and G are functions of $(x,y)$, using subscript notation for the partial derivatives. The PDE is called elliptic if
$$B^2-AC<0,$$
by analogy to the equation for a planar ellipse. Equations with $B^2 - AC = 0$ are termed parabolic while those with $B^2 - AC > 0$ are hyperbolic.

For a general linear second-order PDE, the unknown can be a function of any number of independent variables $u=u(x_1,\dots,x_n)$, satisfying an equation of the form
$$\sum_{i=1}^n\sum_{j=1}^n a_{ij}(x_1,\dots,x_n) u_{x_i x_j} +\sum_{i=1}^n b_i(x_1,\dots,x_n) u_{x_i} +c(x_1,\dots,x_n)u=f(x_1,\dots,x_n).$$
where $a_{ij}, b_i, c, f$ are functions defined on the domain subject to the symmetry $a_{ij}=a_{ji}$. This equation is called elliptic if, viewing $a=(a_{ij})$ as a function of $(x_1,\dots,x_n)$ valued in the space of $n\times n$ symmetric matrices, all eigenvalues are greater than some positive constant: that is, there is a positive number θ such that
$$\sum_{i=1}^n\sum_{j=1}^n a_{ij}(x_1,\dots,x_n)\xi_i\xi_j\geq \theta(\xi_1^2+\cdots+\xi_n^2)$$
for every point $(x_1,\dots,x_n)$ in the domain and all real numbers $\xi_1,\dots,\xi_n$.

The simplest example of a second-order linear elliptic PDE is the Laplace equation, in which the coefficients are the constant functions $a_{ij}=0$ for $i\neq j$, $a_{ii}=1$, and $b_i=c=f=0$. The Poisson equation is a slightly more general second-order linear elliptic PDE, in which f is not required to vanish. For both of these equations, the ellipticity constant θ can be taken to be 1.

The terminology is not used consistently throughout the literature: what is called "elliptic" by some authors is called "strictly elliptic" or "uniformly elliptic" by others.

=== Nonlinear and higher-order equations ===
Ellipticity can also be formulated for more general classes of equations. For the most general second-order PDE, which is of the form

$$F(D^2u,Du,u,x_1,\dots,x_n)=0$$

for some given function F, ellipticity is defined by linearizing the equation and applying the above linear definition. Since linearization is done at a particular function $u$, this means that ellipticity of a nonlinear second-order PDE depends not only on the equation itself but also on the solutions under consideration. For example, the simplest Monge–Ampère equation involves the determinant of the Hessian matrix of the unknown function:

$$\det D^2u = f.$$

As follows from Jacobi's formula for the derivative of a determinant, this equation is elliptic if $f$ is a positive function and solutions satisfy the constraint of being uniformly convex.

There are also higher-order elliptic PDE, the simplest example being the fourth-order biharmonic equation. Even more generally, there is an important class of elliptic systems which consist of coupled partial differential equations for multiple unknown functions. For example, the Cauchy–Riemann equations from complex analysis can be viewed as a first-order elliptic system for a pair of two-variable real functions.

Moreover, the class of elliptic PDE (of any order, including systems) is subject to various notions of weak solutions, i.e., reformulating the equations in a way that allows for solutions with various irregularities (e.g. non-differentiability, singularities or discontinuities), so as to model non-smooth physical phenomena. Such solutions are also important in variational calculus, where the direct method often produces weak solutions for elliptic systems of Euler equations.

== Canonical form ==
Consider a second-order elliptic partial differential equation

$$A(x,y)u_{xx}+2B(x,y)u_{xy}+C(x,y)u_{yy}+f(u_x,u_y,u,x,y)=0$$

for a two-variable function $u=u(x,y)$. This equation is linear in the "leading" highest-order terms, but allows nonlinear expressions involving the function values and their first derivatives; this is sometimes called a quasilinear equation.

A canonical form asks for a transformation $(w,z) = (w(x,y), z(x,y))$ of the $(x,y)$ domain so that, when u is viewed as a function of w and z, the above equation takes the form

$$u_{ww}+u_{zz}+F(u_w,u_z,u,w,z)=0$$

for some new function F. The existence of such a transformation can be established locally if A, B, and C are real-analytic functions and, with more elaborate work, even if they are only continuously differentiable. Locality means that the necessary coordinate transformations may fail to be defined on the entire domain of u, only in some small region surrounding any particular point of the domain.

Formally establishing the existence of such transformations uses the existence of solutions to the Beltrami equation. From the perspective of differential geometry, the existence of a canonical form is equivalent to the existence of isothermal coordinates for the associated Riemannian metric

$$A(x,y) dx^2+2B(x,y)\,dx\,dy+C(x,y)dy^2$$

on the domain. (The ellipticity condition for the PDE, namely the positivity of AC – B^{2}, is what ensures that either this tensor or its negation is indeed a Riemannian metric.)

For second-order quasilinear elliptic partial differential equations in more than two variables, a canonical form does not usually exist. This corresponds to the fact that isothermal coordinates do not exist for general Riemannian metrics in higher dimensions, only for very particular ones.

=== Characteristics and regularity ===
For the general second-order linear PDE, characteristics are defined as the null directions for the associated tensor

$$\sum_{i=1}^n \sum_{j=1}^n a_{i,j}(x_1,\ldots,x_n)\,dx^i\,dx^j,$$

called the principal symbol. Using the technology of the wave front set, characteristics are significant in understanding how irregular points of f propagate to the solution u of the PDE. Informally, the wave front set of a function consists of the points of non-smoothness, in addition to the directions in frequency space causing the lack of smoothness. It is a fundamental fact that the application of a linear differential operator with smooth coefficients can only have the effect of removing points from the wave front set. However, all points of the original wave front set (and possibly more) are recovered by adding back in the (real) characteristic directions of the operator.

In the case of a linear elliptic operator P with smooth coefficients, the principal symbol is a Riemannian metric and there are no real characteristic directions. According to the previous paragraph, it follows that the wave front set of a solution u coincides exactly with that of Pu = f. This sets up a basic regularity theorem, which says that if f is smooth (so that its wave front set is empty) then the solution u is smooth as well. More generally, the points where u fails to be smooth coincide with the points where f is not smooth. This regularity phenomena is in sharp contrast with, for example, hyperbolic PDE in which discontinuities can form even when all the coefficients of an equation are smooth.

Solutions of elliptic PDEs are naturally associated with time-independent solutions of parabolic PDEs or hyperbolic PDEs. For example, a time-independent solution of the heat equation solves Laplace's equation. That is, if parabolic and hyperbolic PDEs are associated with modeling dynamical systems then the solutions of elliptic PDEs are associated with steady states. Informally, this is reflective of the above regularity theorem, as steady states are generally smoothed out versions of truly dynamical solutions. However, PDE used in modeling are often nonlinear and the above regularity theorem only applies to linear elliptic equations; moreover, the regularity theory for nonlinear elliptic equations is much more subtle, with solutions not always being smooth.

== See also ==
- Elliptic boundary value problem
- Elliptic operator
- Hyperbolic partial differential equation
- Parabolic partial differential equation
- Maximum principle (property of solutions)
- Sobolev space
