= Italian Mathematical Union =

Mathematical society based in Italy

- Unione Matematica Italiana
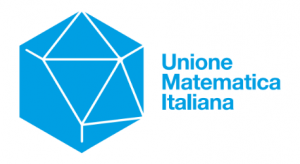

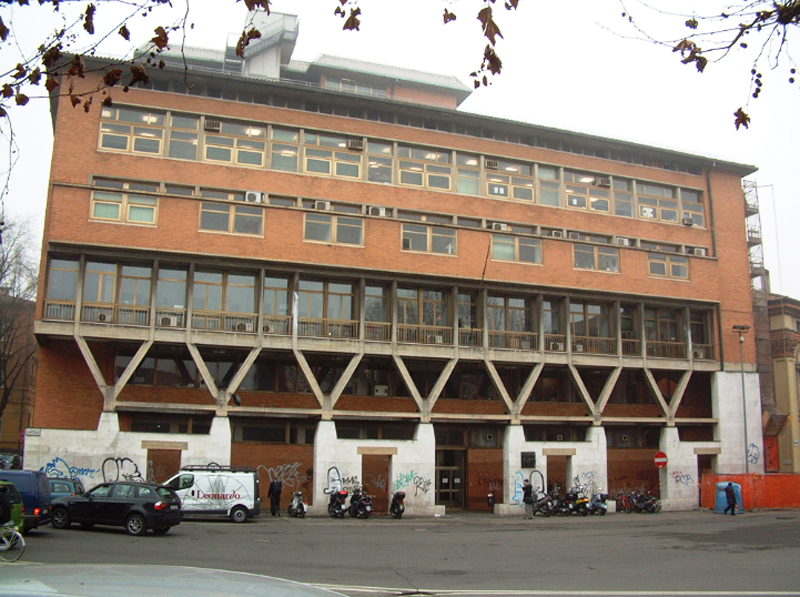
- UMI's headquarters in Bologna
- Formation: 7 December 1922; 103 years ago
- Headquarters: Bologna
- Fields: Mathematics
- Official language: Italian
- President: Piermarco Cannarsa
- Main organ: Bollettino dell'Unione Matematica Italiana
- Affiliations: European Mathematical Society
- Website: https://umi.dm.unibo.it/

The Italian Mathematical Union (Italian: Unione Matematica Italiana) is a mathematical society based in Italy.

It was founded on December 7, 1922, by Luigi Bianchi, Vito Volterra, and most notably, Salvatore Pincherle, who became the Union's first President.

== History ==
Salvatore Pincherle, professor at the University of Bologna, sent on 31 March 1922 a letter to all Italian mathematicians in which he planned the establishment of a national mathematical society. The creation was inspired by similar initiatives in other countries, such as the Société mathématique de France (1872), the Deutsche Mathematiker-Vereinigung (1891), the American Mathematical Society (1891) and, above all, the International Mathematical Union (1920).

The most important Italian mathematicians of the time - among all Luigi Bianchi and Vito Volterra - encouraged Pincherle's initiative also by personally sending articles for the future Bulletin; overall, about 180 mathematicians replied to Pincherle's letter. On December 7 of the same year the first meeting was held.

In 1928 the Italian Mathematical Union hosted the International Congress of Mathematicians in Bologna.

== Activities ==
The Union's journal is the Bollettino dell'Unione Matematica Italiana, which contains two sections: one for research papers, and one for expository articles.

The Italian Mathematical Union awards the following prizes:

- the Bartolozzi Prize
- the Caccioppoli Prize
- the Baldassarri Prize
- the Vinti Prize
- the Stampacchia Medal
- the Tricerri Prize

== List of presidents ==
- 1923-1932: Salvatore Pincherle
- 1932-1948: Luigi Berzolari
- 1949-1952: Enrico Bompiani
- 1952-1958: Giovanni Sansone
- 1958-1964: Alessandro Terracini
- 1965-1968: Giovanni Ricci
- 1968-1971: Guido Stampacchia
- 1971-1974: Guido Stampacchia
- 1974-1977: Enrico Magenes
- 1977-1980: Carlo Pucci
- 1980-1983: Carlo Pucci
- 1983-1986: Vinicio Villani
- 1986-1989: Vinicio Villani
- 1989-1991: Alessandro Figà Talamanca
- 1991-1994: Alessandro Figà Talamanca
- 1994-1997: Alberto Conte
- 1997-2000: Alberto Conte
- 2000-2003: Carlo Sbordone
- 2003-2006: Carlo Sbordone
- 2006-2009: Franco Brezzi
- 2009-2012: Franco Brezzi
- 2012-2015: Ciro Ciliberto
- 2015-2018: Ciro Ciliberto
- 2018-2021: Piermarco Cannarsa
- 2021-2024: Piermarco Cannarsa
