= Max-Albert Knus =

Swiss mathematician born 1942

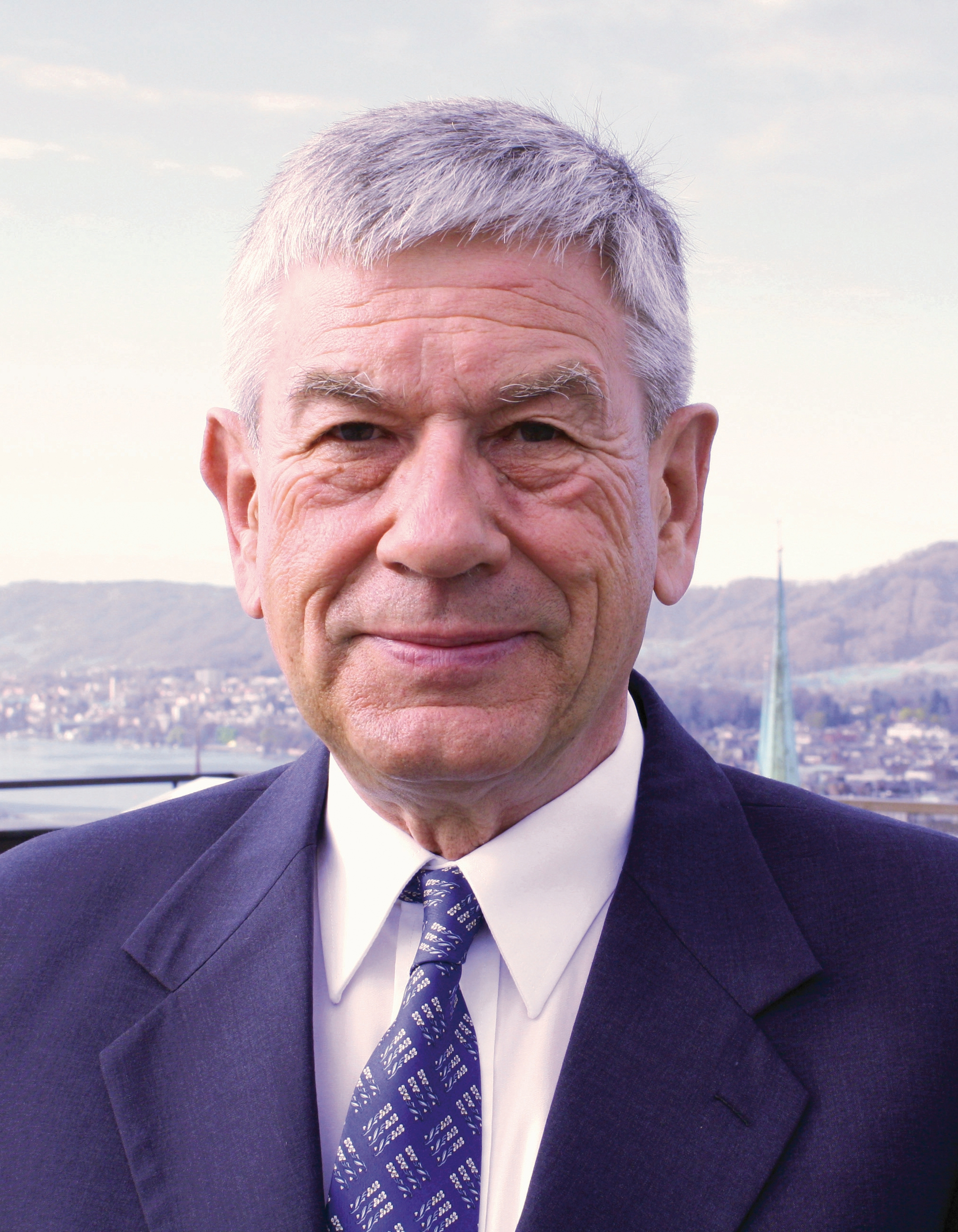
Max-Albert Knus in 2014

Max-Albert Knus is a Swiss mathematician specializing in algebra.

He was born April 14, 1942, in Peseux, Neuchatel. He studied mathematics at ETH Zurich with Beno Eckmann and K. Chandrasekharan, graduating in 1967 with a PhD thesis titled On a class of filtered algebras.

He was a Batelle-fellow at ETH and Brandeis University. He was director of research at University of Geneva. In 1969 he returned to ETH as a professor and became emeritus in 2007.

Knus expanded algebraic number theory to include a wider variety of structures. The classical study considers algebras over a field, whereas Knus considers algebras over a ring as in his monograph Quadratic and Hermitian Forms over Rings (1991). In the preface he acknowledges colleagues that contributed to the science: "Many results in this book were developed by (or in collaboration with) Raman Parimala, Ramaiyengar Sridharan and Manuel Orjanguran. I am deeply grateful to them for doing mathematics in Bombay, Lausanne or Zurich."

Then in 1998 Knus joined Alexander Merkurjev, Markus Rost, and Jean-Pierre Tignol to write The Book of Involutions published by the American Mathematical Society. This book is about "central simple algebras with involution, in relation to linear algebraic groups."

His research interests include Galois cohomology.

Since 1997 he has been a fellow of the Swiss National Science Foundation.

== Selected works ==
- 1974: (with Manuel Ojanguren) Théorie de la Descente et Algèbres d'Azumaya, Lecture Notes in Mathematics #389, Springer-Verlag ISBN 978-3-540-06791-7doi:10.1007/BFb0057799 MR 0417149Zbl 0284.13002
- 1974: "A Mayer-Vietoris sequence for the Brauer group", Journal of Pure and Applied Algebra 5: 345 to 60
- 1978: (with M. Ojanguren & R. Sridharan) "Quadratic forms an Azumaya algebras", Journal für die reine und angewandte Mathematik 303/4: 231 to 48
- 1980: (with R. Parimala) "Quadratic forms associated with projective modules over quaternion algebras", Crelle's Journal 318: 20 to 31
- 1985: (with A. Paques) "Quadratic spaces with trivial Arf invariant", Journal of Algebra 93: 267 to 91
- 1986: (with R. Parimala & R. Sridharan) "On rank 4 quadratic spaces with given Arf and Witt invariants", Mathematische Annalen 274: 181 to 95
- 1988: "Pfaffians and quadratic forms", Advances in Mathematics 71(1): 1 to 20
- 1988: Quadratic forms, Clifford algebras and spinors, Seminarios de Mathematicas, IMEEC, Unicamp, Campinas SP, Brazil
- 1989: (with R. Parimala and R. Sridharan) "A classification of rank 6 quadratic spaces via pfaffians", Journal für die reine und angewandte Mathematik 398: 187 to 218.
- 1990: (with R. Parimala and V. Srinivas) "Azumaya algebras with involutions", Journal of Algebra 130(1): 65 to 82
- 1991; (with R. Parimala & R. Sridharan) "Pfaffians, central simple algebras and similitudes", Mathematische Zeitschrift 206: 589 to 606
- 1991: Quadratic and Hermetian Forms over Rings, Grundlehren der Mathematischen Wissenschaften, Springer ISBN 3-540-52117-8 Zbl 0756.11008 doi:10.1007/978-3-642-75401-2
- 1991: "Involutions on rank 10 central simple algebras", Journal of the Indian Mathematical Society (N.S.) 57(1-4): 143 to 151
- 1991: "On the discriminant of an involution", Bulletin of the Belgian Mathematical Society - Simon Stevin Ser A 43(1-2): 89 to 98
- 1991: "The Clifford algebra of a metabolic space", Archivum Mathematicum 56: 440 to 5
- 1991: "Pfaffians, central simple algebras and similitudes", Mathematische Zeitschrift 206(4): 589 to 604
- 1993: "Sur la form d'Albert et le produit tensoriel de deux algebras de quaternions", Bulletin of the Belgian Mathematical Society - Simon Stevin Ser B 45(3) : 333 to 7
- 1994: "On compositions and triality", Journal für die reine und angewandte Mathematik 457: 45 to 70
- 1995: (with T.Y. Lam, D.B. Shapiro, and J-P. Tignol) "Discriminants of involutions on biquaternion algebras", pages 279 to 303 in K-theory and algebraic geometry: connections with quadratic forms and division algebras, B. Jacob and A. Rosenberg, editors, American Mathematical Society
- 1998: "Cohomologie étale et groupe de Brauer", pages 210 to 28 in Group de Brauer, Lecture Notes in Mathematics # 844
- 1998: (with Alexander Merkurjev, Markus Rost, Jean-Pierre Tignol) The Book of Involutions, American Mathematical Society ISBN 0-8218-0904-0 Zbl 0955.16001 MR 1632779
