= Gonit Sora =

Multilingual website devoted to mathematics

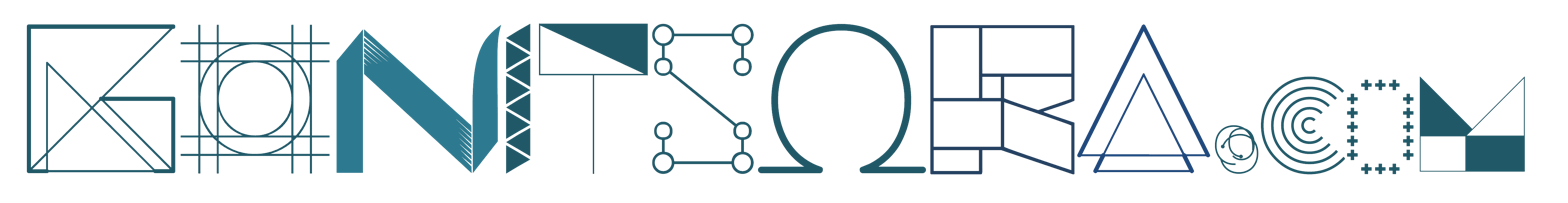
- Website type: Science Website
- Available in: two active editions
- Editors: Manjil Saikia, Pankaj Jyoti Mahanta
- Website: gonitsora.com (English) as.gonitsora.com (Assamese)
- Commercial: No
- Registration: None
- Launched: 21 April 2011; 15 years ago
- Current status: Online
- Content license: Creative Commons Attribution / Share-Alike 4.0^{a} * Media licensing varies
- ^{a} Most text also dual-licensed under GFDL.

Gonit Sora (Assamese: গণিত চ’ৰা) is a multi-lingual (English and Assamese) web magazine devoted to publishing well written and original articles related to science and technology in general and mathematics in particular. Gonit Sora is an attempt to bridge the gap between classroom mathematics teaching and real-life practical and fun mathematics. The website strives for the popularization of mathematics teaching and understanding at all levels. The name of the website is in Assamese and means ‘gateway to mathematics’. Founded on 21 April 2011 by two alumni of Tezpur University, the website publishes expository articles, interviews and quizzes.

The website has its own editors and staff writers, and its advisory board consists of academicians from all over the world, including Sujatha Ramdorai and Nayandeep Deka Baruah. Eminent Mathematicians, including Radha Charan Gupta and Sujatha Ramdorai have contributed articles for Gonit Sora.

== Goals and activities ==
The website has the following goals:

1. To cater to the student community by posting relevant articles in all branches of mathematics,
2. To focus on the humane side of the subject, which is almost always lost in the traditional classroom approach to teaching,
3. Create an online repository of mathematical articles and facts, which can be accessed free of charge by anyone willing to do so,
4. Digitize the regional mathematical content in India in a form that is suitable for the web,
5. Organise workshops and outreach activities for school students to make them see the beauty and joy of doing mathematics,
6. To create a platform for students and teachers alike to discuss ideas, and
7. It makes an attempt to reveal the underlying connection and importance of mathematics in other branches of science through mathematics related articles.

The activities of the website are:

1. Posting articles every week on a topic related to mathematics,
2. Posting interviews with mathematicians like Bruce C. Berndt, Ashoke Sen, S. R. S. Varadhan, Jayant Vishnu Narlikar, James Maynard, Ken Ono, Cedric Villani etc. to motivate the study of the subject among the young students,
3. Digitizing the Assamese texts in mathematics whose copyrights are either in the public domain or expired,
4. Collaborate with the Assam Academy of Mathematics to digitize their enormous mathematical content in terms of articles and books,
5. Organizing and facilitating workshops for Olympiad outreach activities for the school students in the North Eastern part of India, and
6. Answering queries posted on the website for the students, teachers and parents regarding mathematics, its study and problems.

== Collaborations ==
The website has collaborations with the Assam Academy of Mathematics, Xobdo, Shutterstock, Pravega and Asia Pacific Mathematics Newsletter published by World Scientific. It is also a magazine partner of Mathematics of Planet Earth (MPE). In collaboration with various colleges and universities in India, Gonit Sora organises workshops, symposia, colloquia and seminars. In the past, Gonit Sora has also translated mathematics related articles from newspapers, such as The Hindu into Assamese.
