= Neena Gupta (mathematician) =

Indian mathematician (born 1984)

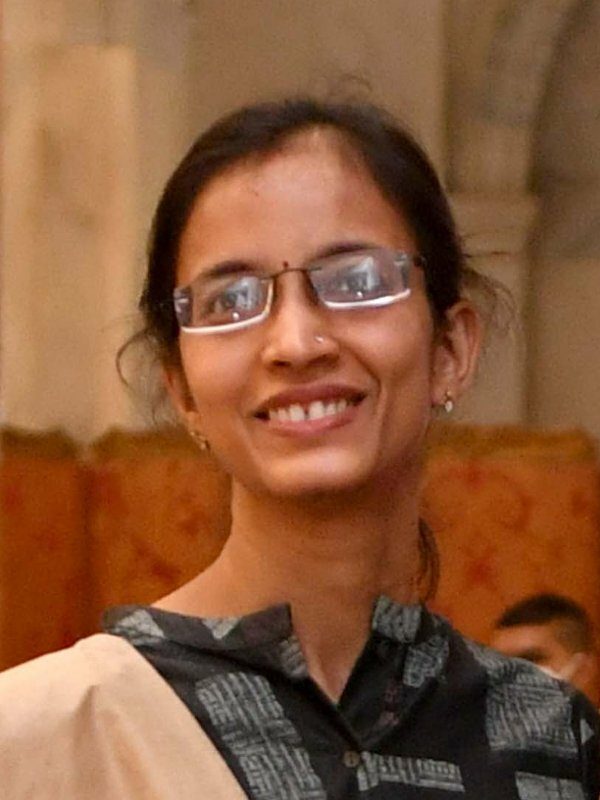
- Gupta in 2022
- Born: 24 November 1984 (age 41); Kolkata, West Bengal, India
- Education: Indian Statistical Institute (PhD), (M.Math); Bethune College (B.Sc.)
- Known for: Providing a counter-example over a field of positive characteristic to the special Zariski Cancellation Problem
- Scientific career
- Fields: Mathematics, commutative algebra, affine algebraic geometry
- Workplaces: ISI, TIFR
- Thesis: Some Results on Laurent Polynomial Fibrations and Quasi A* Algebras (2011)
- Doctoral advisor: Prof. Amartya Dutta

Neena Gupta (born 24 November 1984) is an Indian mathematician and professor at the Statistics and Mathematics Unit of the Indian Statistical Institute (ISI), Kolkata. She is known for solving Zariski Cancellation Problem, originally posed by Oscar Zariski in 1949. Her primary fields of interest are commutative algebra and affine algebraic geometry.

== Education ==
Gupta graduated with honours in mathematics from Bethune College in 2006. She earned her post graduation in mathematics from the Indian Statistical Institute in 2008 and subsequently, her Ph.D. degree in 2011 with commutative algebra as her specialization under the guidance of Amartya Kumar Dutta. The title of her dissertation was "Some results on Laurent polynomial fibrations and Quasi A*-algebras".

== Career ==
Gupta was a Shyama Prasad Mukherjee Research Fellow at ISI Kolkata from 2008 to 2012, and, after a visiting position at Tata Institute of Fundamental Research (TIFR) Mumbai, became INSPIRE Faculty at ISI Kolkata in 2012. She has been a professor in the Statistical and Mathematics Unit of ISI Kolkata since 2014.

She has won the Shanti Swarup Bhatnagar Prize for Science and Technology (2019) in the category of mathematical sciences, the highest honor in India in the field of science and technology. In 2022 she was awarded the ICTP Ramanujan award. She is the third woman from India who got this award (after the duo Raman Parimala (1987 – Sujatha Ramdorai (2004)).

Neena Gupta received the Indian National Science Academy Young Scientist award in 2014. She solved the Zariski Cancellation Problem. Her work has also earned her the inaugural Saraswathi Cowsik Medal in 2013, awarded by the TIFR Alumni Association.

== Awards and honors ==
- Asian Scientist 100 2025 by Asian Scientist
- Infosys Prize 2024 in Mathematical Sciences
- Selected by the American Mathematical Society (AMS) and the Association for Women in Mathematics (AWM) as the Emmy Noether Lecturer for the year 2025 (2024)
- TWAS-CAS young scientist award in Mathematics/ AI by The World Academy of Sciences and the Chinese Academy of Sciences (2023)
- Fellow of the Indian National Science Academy (2023)
- 2nd Ganit Ratna Award (2023)
- Invited speaker at the International Congress of Mathematicians (ICM) 2022
- Nari Shakti Puraskar (2021) by the President of India on 8 March 2022
- DST-ICTP-IMU Ramanujan Prize for Young Mathematicians from Developing Countries (2021)
- Asian Scientist 100, Asian Scientist, 2020 and 2022
- Fellow of the Indian Academy of Sciences (2021)
- The World Academy of Sciences Young Affiliates (2020)
- Shanti Swarup Bhatnagar Prize for Science and Technology (2019)
- BM Birla Science Prize in Mathematics (2017)
- The Swarna Jayanti Fellowship Award, Department of Science and Technology (India) (2015)
- The inaugural Professor A. K. Agarwal Award for best research publication by the Indian Mathematical Society (2014)
- The Indian National Science Academy Young Scientist Award (2014)
- The Ramanujan Prize from the University of Madras (2014)
- Associateship of the Indian Academy of Sciences (2013)
- The Saraswathi Cowsik Medal by the TIFR Alumni Association for her work on the Zariski Cancellation Problem in positive characteristic (2013)
