= Suresh Venapally =

Indian mathematician (born 1966)

Suresh Venepally సురేశ్ వేనెపల్లి
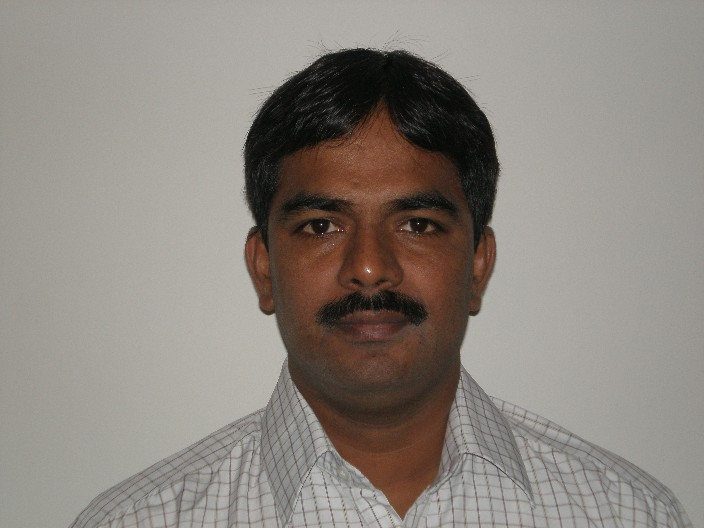
- Suresh Venepally
- Born: 1966 (age 59–60); Vangoor, Telangana
- Citizenship: Indian
- Education: Tata Institute of Fundamental Research (TIFR), University of Hyderabad
- Awards: Shanti Swarup Bhatnagar Award 2009
- Scientific career
- Fields: Algebra
- Workplaces: University of Hyderabad
- Doctoral advisor: Raman Parimala

Suresh Venepally (Telugu: సురేశ్ వేనెపల్లి; born 1966) is an Indian mathematician known for his research work in algebra. He is a professor at Emory University.

== Background ==
Suresh was born in Vangoor, Telangana, India and studied in ZPHS at Vangoor up to 9th standard. He did his M.Sc at University of Hyderabad. He joined Tata Institute of Fundamental Research (TIFR) in 1989 and got his PhD in under the guidance of Raman Parimala (1994). He later joined the faculty at University of Hyderabad.

== Honors ==
- 2026 class of Fellows of the American Mathematical Society
- Shanti Swarup Bhatnagar Award for Mathematical Sciences in 2009
- Invited speaker at the International Congress of Mathematicians held at Hyderabad, India in 2010
- Fellow of the Indian Academy of Sciences
- Andhra Pradesh Scientist Award, 2008
- B. M. Birla Science prize, 2004
- INSA Medal for Young Scientists, 1997

== Selected publications ==
- 1995: "Zero-cycles on quadric fibrations: finiteness theorems and the cycle map", Invent. Math. 122, 83–117 (with Raman Parimala) doi:10.1007/BF01231440
- 1998: "Isotropy of quadratic forms over function fields in one variable over p-adic fields", Publ. de I.H.E.S. 88, 129–150 (with Raman Parimala) doi:10.1007/BF02701768 MR 1733328
- 2001: Hermitian analogue of a theorem of Springer", J.Alg. 243(2), 780-789 (with Raman Parimala and Ramaiyengar Sridharan) doi:10.1006/JABR.2001.8830
- 2010: "Bounding the symbol length in the Galois cohomology of function field of p-adic curves", Comment. Math. Helv. 85(2), 337–346 doi:10.4171/CMH/198, "The u-invariant of the function fields of p-adic curves" Ann. Math. 172(2), 1391-1405 (with Raman Parimala) doi:10.4007/ANNALS.2010.172.1391 MR 2680494 arXiv:0708.3128
