= Jean-Pierre Tignol =

Belgian mathematician

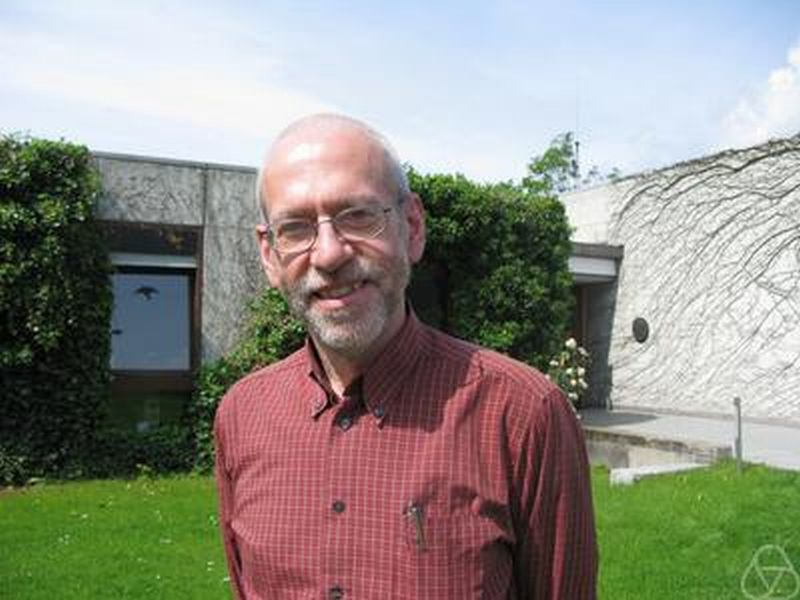
- Jean-Pierre Tignol, Oberwolfach 2009
- Born: 1954 (age 71–72)
- Education: Université catholique de Louvain
- Scientific career
- Fields: Mathematics
- Doctoral advisor: Jacques Tits

Jean-Pierre Tignol (b. 1954) is a Belgian mathematician and historian of mathematics specializing in the field of quadratic forms and linear algebraic groups. He is a full professor emeritus at Université catholique de Louvain.

== Education and career ==
Tignol was awarded a PhD (1988) at the Université catholique de Louvain for his thesis Involution bodies of finite rank at their center and with characteristic other than 21 written under the supervision of Jacques Tits. He subsequently became a professor at the same university. He is the author of numerous papers on algebra and is responsible for extending concepts and results from quadratic form theory to the study of involution algebras. In 1996, he was invited by the European Congress of Mathematics in Budapest to speak on "Algebras with involution and classical groups".

In his 2001 book, Galois' Theory of Algebraic Equations, he explored the evolution of algebra from ancient Babylon to the eras of Galois and Grothendieck. A review by the Mathematical Association of America said, "Anybody with an interest in algebra or the history of mathematics should look at this book. And of course it goes without saying that it belongs in any good university library."

== Books ==
- 2001 Galois' Theory of Algebraic Equations World Scientific, ISBN 9789814704694
- 1998 The Book of Involutions (with Max-Albert Knus, Alexander Merkurjev and Markus Rost), American Mathematical Society, Providence, RI [PDF]
- 2015 Value Functions on Simple Algebras, and Associated Graded Rings (with AR Wadsworth) Springer Cham, ISBN 978-3-319-16359-8

== Papers ==
- 1993 "On the signature of an involution", (with David W. Lewis), Arch. Math. (Basel) 60, no. 2, 128–135.
- 1979 "Division algebras of degree 4 and 8 with involution", (with Shimshon Amitsur and L. H. Rowen), Bulletin of the American Mathematical Society, vol. 115, p. 691-693
- 1987 "Totally ramified valuations on finite-dimensional division algebras", (with A. R. Wadsworth), Transactions of the American Mathematical Society, vol. 302, p. 223-250
- 1995 "The multipliers of similitudes and the Brauer group of homogeneous varieties", (with Alexander Merkurjev), Journal fur die Reine und Angewandte Mathematik, vol. 461, p. 13-48
- 1993 "Hyperbolic involutions", (with Eva Bayer-Fluckiger and D. B. Shapiro), Mathematische Zeitschrift, vol. 214, p. 461-476

== Awards ==
In 1994 he was awarded the Eugene Catalan Prize by the French Academy of Sciences in Belgium.

In the years 2010 to 2012, Jean-Pierre Tignol was awarded several Senior Fellowships of the Zukunftskolleg at the University of Konstanz.
