= Marcel Reich-Ranicki =

Polish-born German literary critic (1920–2013)

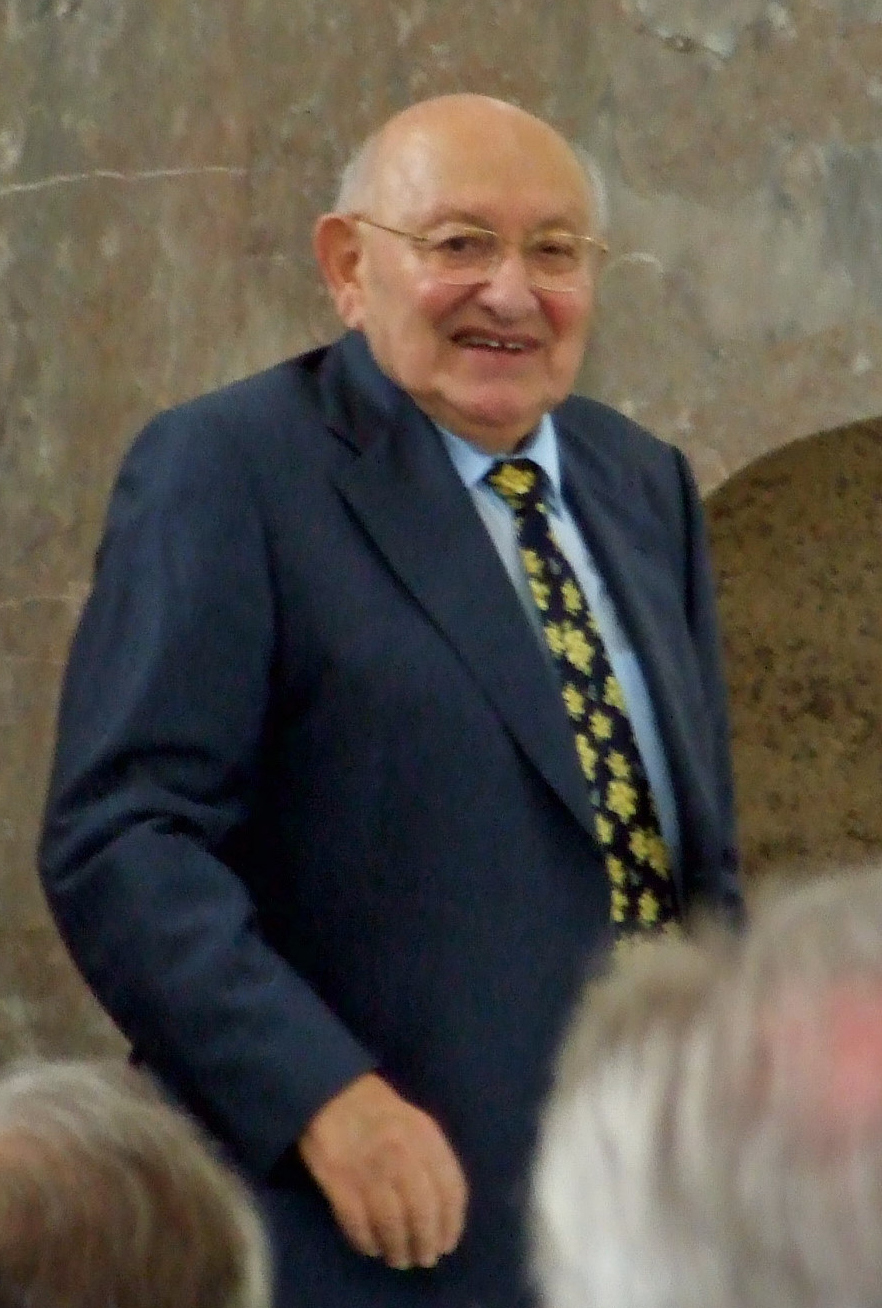
- Reich-Ranicki in 2007
- Born: Marceli Reich; 2 June 1920; Włocławek, Kuyavia, Poland
- Died: 18 September 2013 (aged 93); Frankfurt, Hesse, Germany
- Occupation: Literary critic
- Spouse: Teofila (m. 1942; died 2011)
- Children: Andrew Ranicki
- Writing career
- Notable awards: Goethe Prize (2002)

Marcel Reich-Ranicki (German: [maʁˈsɛl ˌʁaɪçʁaˈnɪtskiː]; born Marceli Reich; 2 June 1920 – 18 September 2013) was a Polish-born German literary critic and member of the informal literary association Gruppe 47. He was regarded as one of the most influential contemporary literary critics in the field of German literature and has often been called Literaturpapst ("Pope of Literature") in Germany. His TV appearances (including the literature TV show Das literarische Quartett) made Reich-Ranicki a household name even among non-readers; in 2010, a survey found that 98% of Germans had heard of him.

== Life ==
=== Early life ===
Marcel Reich was born on 2 June 1920 in Włocławek, Poland, to David Reich, a Polish Jewish merchant, and his wife, Helene (née Auerbach) Reich, who came from a German Jewish family (his cousin was the painter Frank Auerbach). Reich and his family moved to Berlin in 1929. He attended a German school there, but was later sent to Berlin to study.

Reich dedicated himself to the reading of German classics and practicing the theatre. The literary critic Volker Weidermann wrote that "he found his salvation in literature". As a Jew he was unable to enroll at university and was then expelled back to Poland in 1938.. In his 1999 autobiography, The Author of Himself, Ranicki affirmed, "I had a ticket for [a] première that evening – I wouldn't be needing it."

In November 1940, Reich and his parents found themselves in the Warsaw Ghetto, during which time he worked for the Judenrat as a chief translator, and contributed to the collaborative newspaper Gazeta Żydowska (The Jewish Newspaper) as a music critic, writing under the pseudonym "Wiktor Hart". Reich's translation work made him an eyewitness to meetings between the Jewish and Nazi authorities. Ranicki's sister left for England shortly before the war started, but his parents and brother decided not to leave, and did not survive. His parents died in the Treblinka concentration camp. Ranicki himself married his wife Teofila, and in 1943, they escaped the Ghetto.

In 1944, he joined the Polish People's Army, and became an officer in Urząd Bezpieczeństwa, the Soviet-controlled Polish secret police, known for using torture and human rights violations, where he worked in the censorship department. He joined the communist Polish Workers' Party after the war.

From 1948 to 1949, he was a Polish diplomat and intelligence worker (operating under the pseudonym "Ranicki") in London. The couple's only child, Andrew Ranicki, a topologist and mathematics professor, was born in London in 1948. Reich was recalled from London in 1949, sacked from the intelligence service, and expelled from the Party on charges of "ideological estrangement", for which he was also jailed for a short time. Subsequently, he developed a career as an editor, publisher of East German authors, and freelance writer for newspapers and radio with a focus on German literature.

=== Life in Germany ===
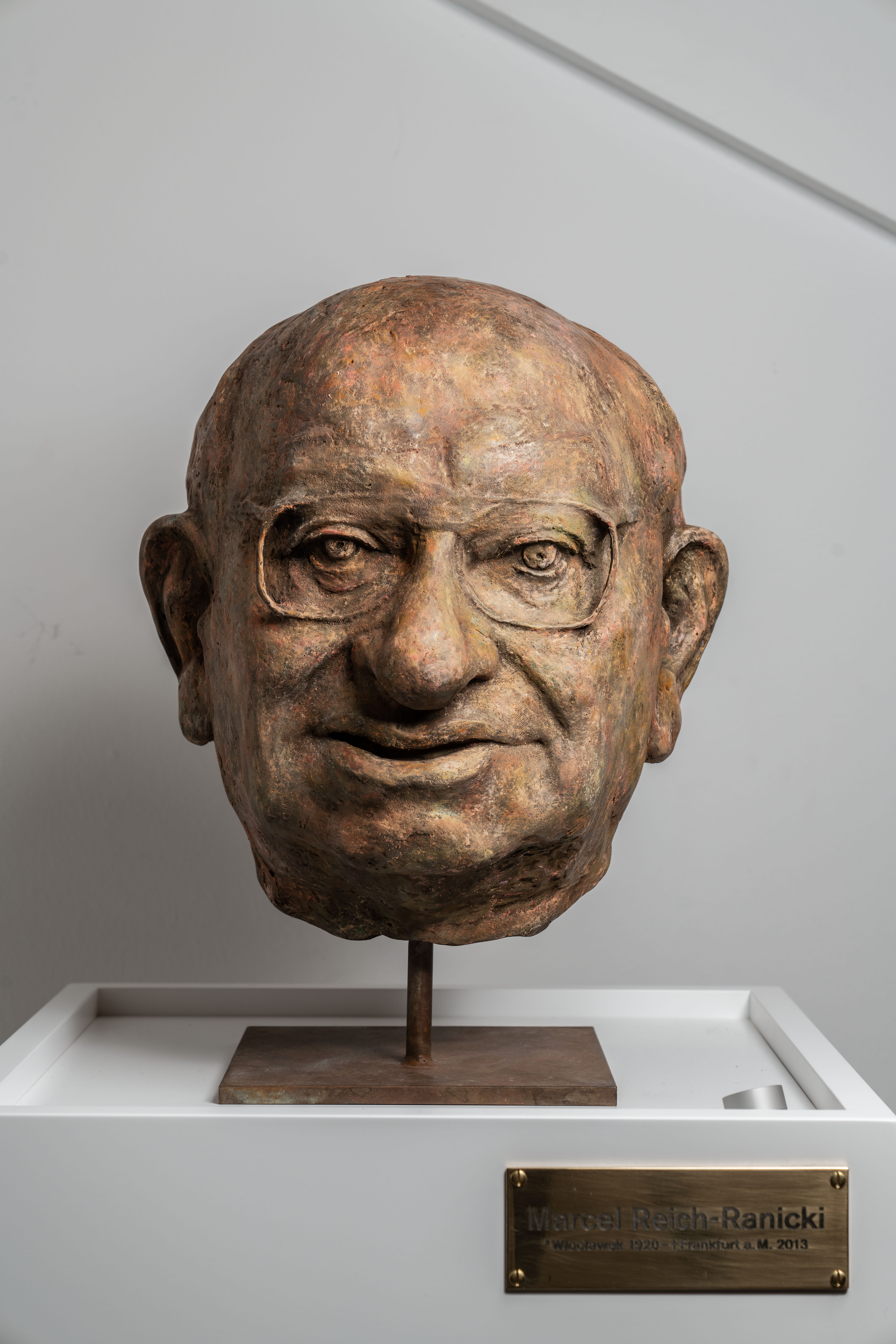
Bust of Reich-Ranicki in Literaturhaus Frankfurt

Frustrated by the curtailment of his liberty in the People's Republic of Poland he emigrated in 1958 with his wife and son to the Federal Republic of Germany (West Germany), living in the city of Hamburg. Here he began writing for leading West German periodicals, including Die Welt and the Frankfurter Allgemeine Zeitung. In Poland, he had published under the pseudonym "Ranicki" (his intelligence codename). On the advice of the arts editor of the Frankfurter Allgemeine, he adopted the name Marcel Reich-Ranicki professionally. From 1963 to 1973, he was literary critic for the West German weekly Die Zeit, published in Hamburg.

In 1973, he moved to Frankfurt, where, from 1973 to 1988, he was head of the literature staff at the daily Frankfurter Allgemeine Zeitung. Reich-Ranicki would go on to write and edit for the Frankfurter Allgemeine Zeitung for the rest of his life. In 1969 he taught at Vermont. From 1971 to 1975, he held visiting professorships at Stockholm and Uppsala.

In 1974, he was awarded an honorary professorship at the University of Tübingen, West Germany. In 1990 and 1991, he received the Heinrich-Hertz visiting professorship of the University of Karlsruhe, and in 1991 and 1992, he received the Heinrich-Heine visiting professorship at the University of Düsseldorf.

From 1988 to 2001, Reich-Ranicki hosted the literary talk show Literarisches Quartett on German public television. He became a household name in Germany; according to a survey, 98% of Germans knew his name. In Summer 2000, fellow panelist Sigrid Löffler left the panel, complaining that Reich-Ranicki had put forward Haruki Murakami's erotic novel South of the Border, West of the Sun for discussion, which Löffler disliked. Reich-Ranicki answered that she had a problem with erotic literature in general. Although differences over Murakami provided a catalyst for Löffler's widely publicised departure from the programme, it does appear that tensions between Löffler and Reich-Ranicki were more broadly based and longstanding, having indeed nourished the programme's dynamic over the years. In 2002, the show was followed by a similar but short-lived programme, Reich-Ranicki Solo, which consisted of him talking about old and new books in front of a studio audience. Jack Zipes wrote: "On his television show, Reich-Ranicki often played the clown, a mixture of Milton Berle and Jack Benny, but you always had to take him seriously because his knowledge of German culture was so comprehensive."

In 1993, the weekly Der Spiegel gave him a dossier of about fifteen pages, under the title "The Lord of Books", tracing his career, first to Die Zeit, then to the Frankfurter Allgemeine Zeitung. Many writers, and readers too, disagreed with some traits of his complex personality, while universally recognizing his culture and passion for German literature.

Having written about German literature for most of his life, he also published books on American and Polish literature. After cutting down on his television appearances, Reich-Ranicki's wife and son encouraged him to write an autobiography "before it was too late". Published in 1999, The Author of Himself: The Life of Marcel Reich-Ranicki was a bestseller in Germany, cementing his status. Mainly dealing with life and survival during the war, the book was adapted for television and broadcast starring Matthias Schweighöfer as Reich-Ranicki in April 2009.

In February 2006, he received an honorary doctorate from Tel Aviv University, which later that year established an endowed chair for German literature named after him. In February 2007, the Humboldt University in Berlin awarded him an honorary degree. This is the same university that Reich-Ranicki applied to in 1938, when his application was turned down because of his Jewish ancestry.

In October 2008, he was awarded a lifetime achievement award at the German Television Awards telecast for Literarisches Quartett. He made headlines with his acceptance speech, in which he spurned the prize and criticized the state of German television. He also declared he would have paid any monetary award back, had the prize been associated with a monetary reward.

In 2012, Reich-Ranicki made a speech at the Bundestag on International Holocaust Remembrance Day. He continued to write a weekly column in the Frankfurter Allgemeine Zeitung until shortly before his death.

The autobiography "The Author of Himself", published in 1999, begins with Reich-Ranicki reporting a conversation in 1958 with Günter Grass asking him: "Are you German, or Polish, or what?". The answer was: "Half German...".

=== Death ===
Reich-Ranicki died on 18 September 2013 in Frankfurt, having previously been diagnosed with prostate cancer. German Chancellor Angela Merkel paid tribute: "We lose in him a peerless friend of literature, but also of freedom and democracy. I will miss this passionate and brilliant man." The Süddeutsche Zeitung described Reich-Ranicki as "the man who taught us how to read."

Marcel's son, Andrew Ranicki (1948–2018), was a professor of mathematics at the University of Edinburgh. Marcel's wife, Teofila Reich-Ranicki, predeceased her husband by two years, dying in 2011. According to The Economist, "He appreciated Jewish culture, especially its way with words, but found religion pointless and, after Warsaw, God inconceivable."

== Relationships with authors ==
As a tough critic, Reich-Ranicki had a difficult relationship with other authors. Following the publication of Too Far Afield by his fellow Gruppe 47 member Günter Grass, Reich-Ranicki appeared on the cover of the magazine Der Spiegel, tearing the novel apart. The magazine included his unfavorable review of the book. Reich-Ranicki praised Grass' next book, Crabwalk. Another frequent target of Reich-Ranicki was writer Martin Walser. In 2002, Walser published the crime novel Death of a Critic (Tod eines Kritikers) as a revenge against Reich-Ranicki. In the book, a prominent, bigoted critic named André Ehrl-König – who shares many similarities with Reich-Ranicki – is murdered. The novel became a hot topic of debate in Germany.

Australian writer Clive James stated: "Every living German writer wants his praise, but it has always been hard to get: the reason, of course, why they would like to have it."

== Works ==
- Literarisches Leben in Deutschland 1963
- Deutsche Literatur in Ost und West Piper 1963, DTV 1983 (revised)
- Literarisches Leben in Deutschland. Kommentare u. Pamphlete. Munich: Piper 1965
- Wer schreibt, provoziert 1966, 1992
- Literatur der kleinen Schritte. Deutsche Schriftsteller heute. Piper 1967
- Die Ungeliebten. Sieben Emigranten. 1968
- In Sachen Böll. Ansichten und Einsichten. 1968, 1994
- Über Ruhestörer. Juden in der deutschen Literatur. Piper 1973.
- Nachprüfung, Aufsätze über deutsche Schriftsteller von gestern. Piper 1977, DTV 1980, 1990 (revised)
- (Ed.) Frankfurter Anthologie. Volume 1–29, Frankfurt: Insel 1978–2006
- Entgegnung, Zur deutschen Literatur der siebziger Jahre. Deutsche Verlags-Anstalt 1981
- Nichts als Literatur. Aufsätze und Anmerkungen. Reclam 1986
- Thomas Mann und die Seinen. Stuttgart: Deutsche Verlags-Anstalt 1987, ISBN 3-421-06364-8
- (Ed.) Deutsche Erzählungen des 20. Jahrhunderts. (5 volumes) 1991
- Der doppelte Boden. (Interviews with Peter von Matt) 1992
- Lauter Verrisse. Munich: DTV 1993, ISBN 3-423-11578-5
- Die Anwälte der Literatur. Deutsche Verlags-Anstalt 1994
- Herz, Arzt und Literatur: Zwei Aufsätze. Ammann 1994
- Romane von gestern, heute gelesen II. 1918 – 1933. Fischer 1996
- Verweile doch – 111 Gedichte mit Interpretationen Insel 1999
- Mein Leben. Deutsche Verlags-Anstalt 1999, ISBN 3-423-13056-3 – The Author of Himself: The Life of Marcel Reich-Ranicki. Princeton University Press, 2001, ISBN 978-0691090405
- Der Fall Heine. DTV 2000, ISBN 3-423-12774-0
- (with Sigrid Löffler and Hellmuth Karasek) ... und alle Fragen offen. Das Beste aus dem Literarischen Quartett. Heyne 2000. ISBN 3-453-16506-3.
- (Ed.) Hundert Gedichte des Jahrhunderts. Insel 2001
- (Ed.) Ein Jüngling liebt ein Mädchen. Deutsche Gedichte und ihre Interpretationen. Insel 2001
- Ungeheuer oben. Über Bertolt Brecht. Aufbau 2001
- Deutsche Literatur in West und Ost. DTV 2002
- Sieben Wegbereiter. Schriftsteller des 20. Jahrhunderts. Munich: Deutsche Verlags-Anstalt 2002, ISBN 3-421-05514-9
- Kritik als Beruf. Fischer 2002, ISBN 3-596-15577-0
- Über Literaturkritik. Deutsche Verlags-Anstalt 2002
- Erst leben, dann spielen. Über polnische Literatur. Wallstein 2002
- Lauter schwierige Patienten. List 2003
- Meine Bilder. Porträts und Aufsätze. Deutsche Verlags-Anstalt 2003, ISBN 3-421-05619-6
- Meine Geschichten. Von Johann Wolfgang Goethe bis heute. Insel 2003
- Unser Grass. Deutsche Verlags-Anstalt 2003, ISBN 3-421-05796-6
- Vom Tag gefordert. Reden in deutschen Angelegenheiten. DTV 2003, ISBN 3-423-13145-4
- Meine Geschichten. Von Johann Wolfgang von Goethe bis heute. Insel, 2003, ISBN 3-458-17166-5
- (Ed.) Meine Gedichte. Seit Walther von der Vogelweide. Insel 2003
- (Ed.) Hundert Gedichte des Jahrhunderts 2003
- (Ed.) Der Kanon. Die deutsche Literatur Erzählungen. Insel 2002–2006
- Sieben Wegbereiter: Schriftsteller des zwanzigsten Jahrhunderts. DTV 2004
- Goethe noch einmal: Reden und Anmerkungen. DTV 2004
- (Ed.) Meine Schulzeit im Dritten Reich. Erinnerungen deutscher Schriftsteller. DTV 2006
- Marcel Reich-Ranicki im Gespräch mit Wolfgang Koeppen. Suhrkamp 2006
- Der Mond über Soho: 66 Gedichte mit Interpretationen. (poems by Bertolt Brecht) Insel 2006
- Über Amerikaner. Von Hemingway und Bellow bis Updike und Philip Roth. DTV 2006
- Aus persönlicher Sicht. Gespräche 1999 bis 2006 Marcel Reich- Ranicki, Christiane Schmidt; DVA 2006
- Marcel Reich-Ranicki antwortet auf 99 Fragen. Insel 2006, ISBN 3-458-34888-3
- Herrlich wie am ersten Tag: 125 Gedichte und ihre Interpretationen Insel 2008
- Die Literatur, eine Heimat: Reden über und von Marcel Reich-Ranicki DVA 2008
- (Ed.) Mein Schiller Insel 2009
- (Ed.) Mein Lessing Hoffmann und Campe 2009
- Für alle Fragen offen: Antworten zur Weltliteratur 2009

== See also ==
- German literature
- List of Polish People
- Marcel Reich-Ranicki's anthology of exemplary German literature Der Kanon
