= Eugene Catalan Prize =

Mathematics prize

The Eugene Catalan Prize (Prix Eugène-Catalan) is awarded every five years by the Royal Academies for Science and the Arts of Belgium to recognize a scholar who has made important progress in pure mathematics. The prize, created in honor of the mathematician Eugène Charles Catalan, was first given in 1969; the original criteria specified Belgian or French scholars but European Union citizens are now eligible.

== Recipients ==
The recipients of the Eugene Catalan Prize are:

- 2025: Christophe Charlier
- 2020: Antoine Gloria
- 2015: Pierre Bieliavsky
- 2010: Pierre-Emmanuel Caprace
- 2005: Didier Smets
- 2000: Jean-Michel Coron
- 1995: Jean-Pierre Tignol
- 1990: Haïm Brezis
- 1979: Roger Apéry
- 1974: J. Goffar-Lombet
- 1969: Gilbert Crombez

== See also ==
- List of mathematics awards
