= Andrew Ranicki =

British mathematician and professor (1948–2018)

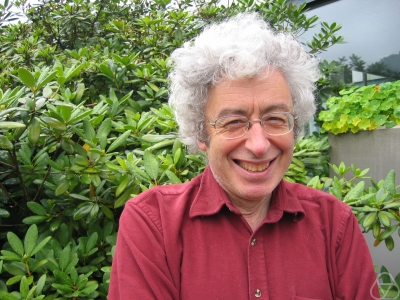
- Ranicki in 2006
- Born: 30 December 1948; London, England
- Died: 21 February 2018 (aged 69); Edinburgh, Scotland
- Education: Trinity College, Cambridge
- Spouse: Ida Thompson
- Children: 1
- Parent(s): Marcel Reich-Ranicki; Teofila Reich-Ranicki
- Scientific career
- Fields: Mathematics
- Workplaces: Trinity College, Cambridge; Princeton University; University of Edinburgh
- Doctoral advisors: Andrew Casson; John Frank Adams
- Website: www.maths.ed.ac.uk/~v1ranick/

Andrew Alexander Ranicki (born Andrzej Aleksander Ranicki; 30 December 1948 – 21 February 2018) was a British mathematician who worked on algebraic topology. He was a professor of mathematics at the University of Edinburgh.

== Life ==
Ranicki was the only child of the well-known literary critic Marcel Reich-Ranicki and the artist Teofila Reich-Ranicki; he spoke Polish in his family. Born in London, he lived in Warsaw, in Frankfurt am Main and Hamburg, and attended school in England at the King's School, Canterbury from the age of sixteen.

Ranicki studied Mathematics at Trinity College, Cambridge, and graduated with a BA in 1969. At Cambridge, he was a student of topologists Andrew Casson and John Frank Adams. He earned his doctoral degree in 1973 with a thesis on algebraic L-theory. Ranicki received numerous awards and honors for his scientific achievements during his studies. From 1972 to 1977, he was a Fellow of Trinity College.

From 1977 to 1982, he was assistant professor at Princeton University. In 1982, he began at the University of Edinburgh as a lecturer; in 1987, he was promoted to reader. In 1992, he became a Fellow of the Royal Society of Edinburgh. From 1995, Ranicki was the Chair of Algebraic Surgery at the University of Edinburgh. Several times, he stayed as a visiting scientist at the Max Planck Institute for Mathematics in Bonn, most recently in 2011.

== Personal life and death ==
Ranicki married American paleontologist Ida Thompson in 1979; they had a daughter. Ranicki suffered from leukemia; he died peacefully in the presence of his wife.

A conference celebrating his legacy was held at the International Centre for Mathematical Sciences (Edinburgh) in summer 2020.

== Published works ==
- Exact sequences in the algebraic theory of surgery, Princeton University Press, 1981.
- Lower K and L Theory, London Mathematical Society Lecture Notes, Vol. 178, Cambridge University Press. 1992.
- Algebraic L-Theory and Topological Manifolds, Cambridge Tracts in Mathematics Vol. 102, Cambridge University Press, 1992.
- Algebraic and Geometric Surgery, Oxford University Press, 2002.
- High dimensional knot theory , Springer, 1998.
- with Bruce Hughes: Ends of Complexes , Cambridge Tracts in Mathematics Vol. 123, Cambridge University Press, 1996.
- with Norman Levitt and Frank Quinn: "Algebraic and geometric topology" (Rutgers University conference, New Brunswick, 1983), Springer 1985, Lecture Notes in Mathematics Vol. 1126.
- Editor with David W. Lewis and Eva Bayer-Fluckiger: "Quadratic forms and their applications" (Conference Dublin 1999), Contemporary Mathematics Vol. 272, American Mathematical Society, 2000.
- Publisher: Noncommutative Localization in Algebra and Topology , London Mathematical Society Vol. 330, Cambridge University Press, 2006.
- Editor with Steven Ferry and Jonathan Rosenberg: "The Novikov conjectures, index theorems and rigidity" (Oberwolfach, 1993), London Mathematical Society Lecture Notes, Vol. 226, 227, Cambridge University Press, 1995.
- Editor: The Hauptvermutung Book, Kluwer, 1996.
- Editor with Sylvain Cappell and Jonathan Rosenberg: Surveys on surgery theory. Papers dedicated to C.T. C. Wall.
