= David W. Lewis (mathematician) =

Manx mathematician (1944–2021)

- Born: 21 February 1944; Douglas, Isle of Man
- Died: 20 August 2021 (aged 77); Dublin
- Education: BSc (1965), University of Liverpool; PhD (1979), NUI; DSc (1992), NUI
- Scientific career
- Fields: Mathematics
- Institutions: University College Dublin
- Thesis: Hermitian Forms over Algebras with Involution (1979)
- Doctoral advisor: C. T. C. Wall

David W. Lewis (21 February 1944 in Douglas, Isle of Man—20 August 2021 in Dublin) was a Manx mathematician known for his contributions to quadratic forms theory. He spent his entire career at University College Dublin (UCD), where he was head of the Department of Mathematics (now the School of Mathematics and Statistics) from 1999 until 2002. After his retirement in 2009 he remained research active for many years.

== Education and career ==
Lewis attended Douglas High School where he developed an interest in physics and astronomy, and ultimately mathematics. He attended the University of Liverpool, and after completing his BSc degree in 1965 commenced doctoral studies in topology under the guidance of CTC (Terry) Wall. When his PhD funding ended in 1968, he started as assistant lecturer at the UCD Mathematics Department, while continuing the work on his doctoral thesis, shifting from topology to algebra and specifically to the area of quadratic and hermitian forms.

During his first decade of lecturing at UCD, he completed his PhD thesis, Hermitian Forms over Algebras with Involution, under the supervision of Professor Wall and was awarded a doctorate by the National University of Ireland in 1979. He received a DSc from NUI in 1992, and served as head of the Department of Mathematics there from 1999 until 2002.

He supervised 4 PhDs and authored one monograph.

== Books ==
- Lewis, David W. (1991). Matrix Theory. River Edge, NJ: World Scientific Publishing Co., Inc. doi:10.1142/1424. ISBN 978-981-02-0689-5.
- Bayer-Fluckiger, Eva; Lewis, David; Ranicki, Andrew, eds. (2000). Quadratic Forms and Their Applications. Conference on Quadratic Forms and Their Applications, July 5–9, 1999, University College Dublin. Contemporary Mathematics. Vol. 272. American Mathematical Society. doi:10.1090/conm/272.

== Selected papers ==
- Cortella, Anne; Lewis, David W. (2013). "Sesquilinear Morita equivalence and orthogonal sum of algebras with antiautomorphism". Communications in Algebra. 41 (12): 4463–4490. doi:10.1080/00927872.2012.704462.
- De Wannemacker, Stefan A.G.; Lewis, David W. (2007). "Structure theorems for AP rings". Journal of Algebra. 315 (1): 144–158. arXiv:math/0701830. doi:10.1016/j.jalgebra.2007.02.016.
- Lewis, David W.; Unger, Thomas (2003). "A local-global principle for algebras with involution and Hermitian forms". Mathematische Zeitschrift. 244 (3): 469–477. doi:10.1007/s00209-003-0490-6.
- Lewis, D. W.; McGarraghy, S. (2000). "Annihilating polynomials, étale algebras, trace forms and the Galois number". Archiv der Mathematik. 75 (2): 116–120. doi:10.1007/PL00000430.
- Lewis, David W.; Tignol, J.-P. (1993). "On the signature of an involution". Archiv der Mathematik. 60 (2): 128–135. doi:10.1007/BF01199098.
- Lewis, D. W. (1987). "Witt rings as integral rings". Inventiones Mathematicae. 90 (3): 631–633. Bibcode:1987InMat..90..631L. doi:10.1007/BF01389181.
- Lewis, D. W. (1985). "Periodicity of Clifford algebras and exact octagons of Witt groups". Mathematical Proceedings of the Cambridge Philosophical Society. 98 (2): 263–269. Bibcode:1985MPCPS..98..263L. doi:10.1017/S0305004100063441.
- Lewis, D. W. (1982). "New improved exact sequences of Witt groups". Journal of Algebra. 74 (1): 206–210. doi:10.1016/0021-8693(82)90013-8.
- Lewis, D. W. (1977). "Forms over real algebras and the multisignature of a manifold". Advances in Mathematics. 23 (3): 272–284. doi:10.1016/S0001-8708(77)80030-3.
