= Amalendu Krishna =

Indian university teacher (born 1971)

- Education: TIFR
- Known for: Algebraic cycles, K-theory,
- Awards: ICTP Ramanujan Prize (2015); Shanti Swarup Bhatnagar Award (2016)
- Scientific career
- Fields: Mathematics
- Workplaces: TIFR, IISc
- Thesis: Zero Cycles and K-theory on normal surfaces
- Doctoral advisor: Vasudevan Srinivas

Amalendu Krishna (born 2 August 1971) is an Indian mathematician in the Department of Mathematics, University of California at Santa Barbara (UCSB), Santa Barbara, specializing in algebraic cycles and K-theory. He was awarded the Shanti Swarup Bhatnagar Prize for Science and Technology, India's highest prize for excellence in science, mathematics and technology, in the mathematical sciences category in 2016. The next year he was recognized on the Asian Scientist 100.

== Career ==
Krishna was a recipient of the ICTP Ramanujan Prize in the year 2015. The ICTP Ramanujan Prize for Young Mathematicians from Developing Countries is awarded annually by the International Centre for Theoretical Physics, Trieste, Italy and named after Srinivasa Ramanujan jointly with the Department of Science and Technology (Government of India), and the International Mathematical Union. It was founded in 2004 and was first awarded in 2005. The Prize is awarded to a researcher less than 45 years of age, who has conducted outstanding research in a developing country. This is the second time it is being awarded to an Indian, with Sujatha Ramadorai having won it in 2006. According to website of the International Centre for Theoretical Physics: "The prize is in recognition of Krishna's outstanding contributions in the area of algebraic K-theory, algebraic cycles and the theory of motives. In his work, Krishna has shown an impressive command of a very technical subject, applying the modern theories of algebraic K-theory and Voevodsky's theory of motives to study concrete problems. His results on 0-cycles on algebraic varieties with isolated singularities effectively reduces their study to the corresponding study on the desingularization, together with information about multiples of the exceptional divisors. This allows the complete calculation of the Chow group of 0-cycles on an algebraic variety in many cases, like the case of rational varieties or cones. Working initially with Levine, and later with Park, Krishna built up the original constructions of Bloch-Esnault on additive Chow groups into a full theory. This includes proving fundamental properties, such as the contravariant functoriality and a projective bundle formula, as well as constructing an action of the usual higher Chow groups on the additive ones."

Amalendu Krishna hails from Madhubani, Bihar, where he had his school education. He dropped out of IIT, Kanpur, after getting disillusioned by the job-oriented focus of engineering students there. He joined the Indian Statistical Institute in Kolkata. After completing post-graduate studies there in 1996, he joined TIFR to pursue PhD studies. He completed his PhD from TIFR under the supervision of Vasudevan Srinivas in 2001. During 2001 - 2004 he was Hedrick Assistant Professor in University of California, Los Angeles, and during 2004/05 he was at the Institute for Advanced Study in Princeton University. In 2005 he returned to TIFR as a faculty. In 2020 he moved to the Indian Institute of Science as a professor.
