= Sigrid Löffler =

Austrian cultural commentator, arts correspondent and literary critic

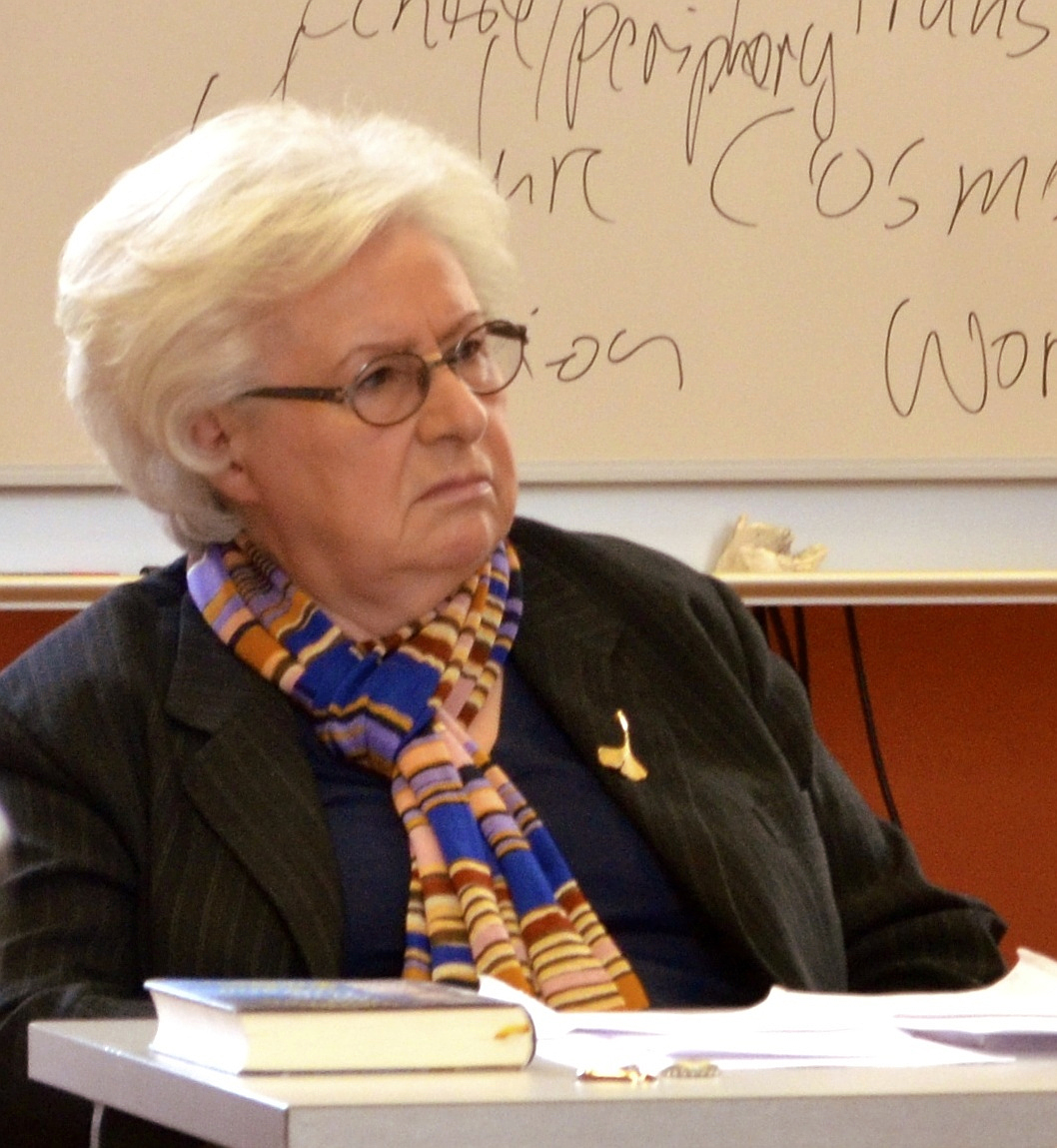
- Löffler in 2014
- Born: 26 June 1942 (age 84); Aussig, Czechoslovakia
- Education: University of Vienna
- Occupations: cultural commentator literary critic

Sigrid Löffler (born 26 June 1942) is an Austrian cultural commentator, arts correspondent and literary critic.

== Life ==
Sigrid Löffler was born in Aussig (as it was known till 1945) in Czechoslovakia, at the height of the Second World War. As she later spelled out to an interviewer, she was presumably conceived while her father was on leave from the frontline. Her mother's family came from the northern border region of Bohemia that had more recently become known as the Sudetenland. During the ethnic cleansing of 1945 her mother took her to rejoin her father in Vienna where he was rebuilding his peace-time career as a teacher. It was in Vienna—under military occupation till 1955—that she grew up, acutely aware of her "outsider status" as a Protestant in a conservative city determined, during the 1950s, to recreate its catholic (pre-Nazi) past. At the university she worked on English studies, German studies, philosophy and pedagogy, receiving a master's degree. Her doctorate followed in 1966.

Her father's wish was that she should follow him into the teaching profession, which briefly she did, teaching German as a foreign language in England during 1966/67. After this experience Löffler decided to pursue a career in journalism, working between 1968 and 1972 as a foreign political editor with Die Presse, a liberal centrist daily newspaper based in Vienna.

Between 1972 and 1993 she was on the editorial team of the Vienna-based news magazine, Profil, ending up as head of arts and culture and deputy editor in chief. She was also working as arts correspondent for several major newspapers (Süddeutsche Zeitung, Die Zeit, Die Woche}, magazines and broadcasters. Between 1996 and 1999 Löffler was in charge of the Feuilleton section of Die Zeit.

In 1988 Sigrid Löffler became a regular participant in "Das Literarische Quartett" ("The Literary Quartet"), a weekly television programme produced by West Germany's ZDF in collaboration (at that time) with Austria's ORF. The programme presented book reviews provided (and argued over) by its permanent panel of four literary critics. Löffler left the panel in June 2000, complaining because a fellow panelist, the literary critic Marcel Reich-Ranicki had put forward Haruki Murakami's erotic novel South of the Border, West of the Sun for discussion. Describing the book as "literary fast food", Löffler made it clear that she found it inappropriately trivial for inclusion in a series devoted to serious literature. Her fellow panelist, Reich-Ranicki, retorted that she had a problem with erotic literature in general. Although differences over the Murakami provided a catalyst for Löffler's widely publicised departure from the programme, it does appear that tensions between Löffler and Reich-Ranicki were more broadly based and longstanding, having indeed nourished the programme's dynamic over the years. Her empty seat was taken by Iris Radisch until the series was dropped at the end of 2001. (It has subsequently been reformatted and revived by ZDF) After stepping down from "Literary Quartet", in August 2000 Löffler became the producer for the literary journal Literaturen, stepping down a little over eight years later following differences over whether or not to take the publication down-market. Löffler opposed moving Literaturen down-market.

Löffler's 2014 collection of essays on recent trans- and multinational writers „Die neue Weltliteratur und ihre großen Erzähler“ (The New World Literature and Its Great Narrators) enjoyed widespread critical attention.

== Literary prize juries and more controversy ==
Sigrid Löffler drew strong criticism as a jury member for the Alfred Toepfer Foundation when together with fellow jury member Gertrud Fussenegger she voted to award the 1991 Franz Grillparzer Literary Prize to the politically controversial novelist Peter Handke. She has also been a member of the jury for the Leipzig Book Fair and for the Heinrich Heine Prize. In 2006 she announced her resignation from the Heinrich Heine Prize jury in connection with plans to award this prize to (the still controversial) Peter Handke. In doing so she expressed her exasperation over fellow jurors who she believed had introduced "unsubstantiated and damaging assertions into play". (In the end, because of disputes stirred up by Handke's political views, the Heinrich Heine Prize was not awarded in 2006.) In 2007, when Martin Mosebach won the Georg Büchner Prize, Löffler went public with her view that Mosebach's reactionary views made him quite unsuitable to receive the highest literary award in the German-speaking world.

== Awards and prizes (selection) ==
- 1974: Dr. Karl Renner Journalism Prize
- 1991: Bavarian Television Prize
- 1992: Austrian National Prize for Arts Journalism
- 2001: City of Vienna Journalism Prize
- 2010: Honorary Doctorate from Bielefeld University, Faculty of Literature
