= Smitri Kumar Sinha =

Indian academic (born 1962)

Smirti Kumar Sinha
- Born: 8 October 1962 (age 63)
- Education: Tezpur University PhD, Gauhati University
- Known for: Network security, web technology, social network analysis, Computational linguistics
- Scientific career
- Fields: Computer science
- Workplaces: Pragjyotishpur University, Tezpur University

Smitri Kumar Sinha (born 8 October 1962) is an Indian academic and education administrator , former Vice Chancellor of Pragjyotishpur University, Assam. Previously, he served as a professor of Computer Science and Dean at Tezpur University, Assam.
