= Nayandeep Deka Baruah =

Indian mathematician and professor (born 1972)

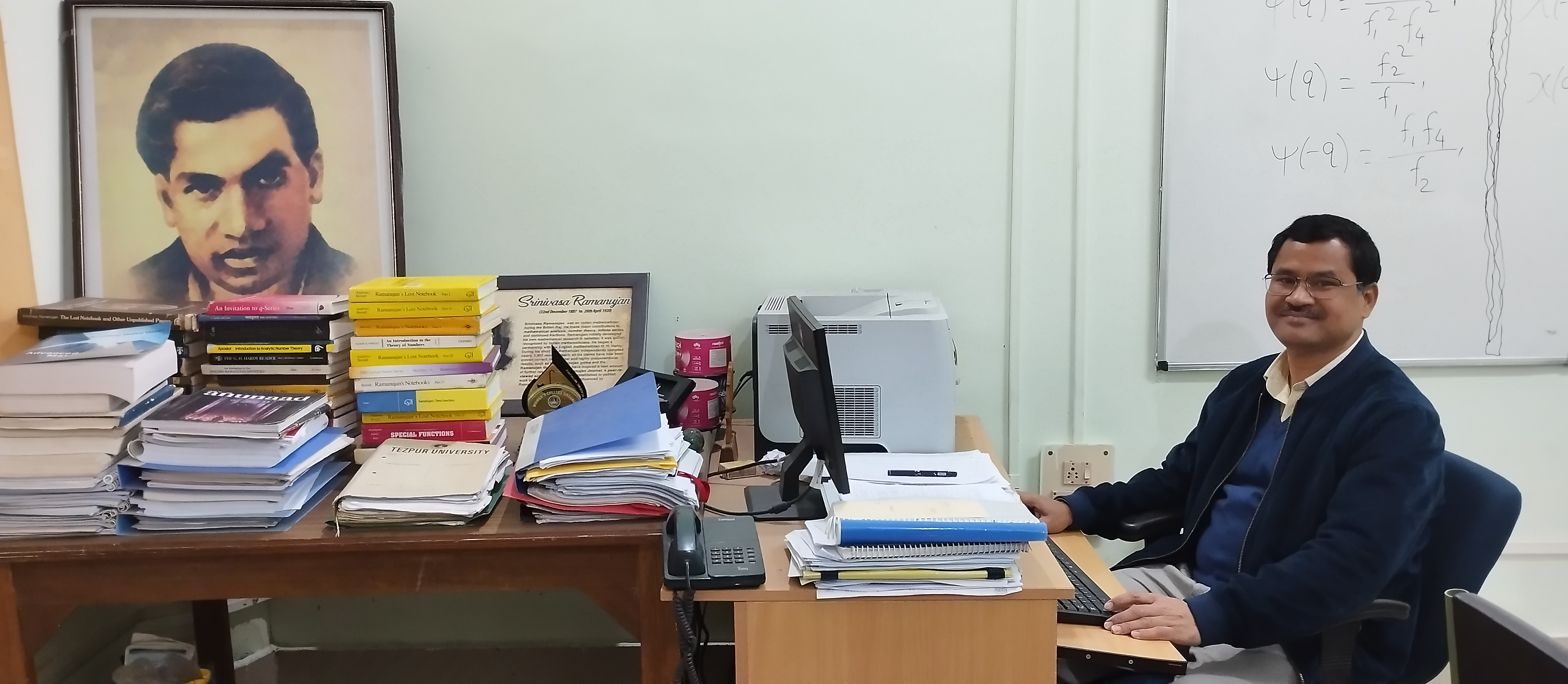
- Born: 1972 (age 53–54); Assam, India
- Education: Cotton College; IIT Kanpur; Tezpur University
- Notable work: Ramanujan type congruences, partition theory

Nayandeep Deka Baruah (born 1972) is an Indian mathematician and at present professor in the Department of Mathematical Sciences at Tezpur University, India. He is known for his work related to the mathematics of Ramanujan, in particular he and his collaborators have found several Ramanujan type congruences using different methods.

== Biography ==
Baruah started his school education in Sibsagar district of Assam, and then went to Cotton College, Guwahati, to do his bachelor's degree in mathematics in 1992. He graduated with a masters in mathematics from the Indian Institute of Technology, Kanpur (IITK), India in 1995 and a Ph.D. in mathematics from Tezpur University, India in 2001. The title of his Ph.D. thesis was Contributions to Ramanujan's Schlafli-type Modular Equations, Class Invariants, Theta-functions, and Continued Fractions. Following a short stint at Assam University, Silchar, Baruah has been a member of the faculty at Tezpur since 1997, becoming full professor in 2009. For a period of one year in 2006–07, he was a visitor at the University of Illinois, Urbana-Champaign working with Bruce C. Berndt.

== Awards and honours ==
Baruah has been a recipient of the Young Scientist Award from the Indian Science Congress Association in 2004 and a BOYSCAST Fellowship from the Department of Science and Technology, Government of India in 2005–06.

== Professional contributions ==
Baruah has written over 50 research papers so far related to special functions, modular equation, Basic hypergeometric series and integer partitions. He has so far guided 14 students under him for their Ph.D. dissertation. Baruah is also associated with giving several popular lectures for school and college students in different places of Assam as well as in other parts of the country; and is a member of the advisory board of the online magazine Gonit Sora.

Baruah is a member of several distinguished professional societies and serves on several committees related to university education. He is also on the editorial board of the Journal of the Assam Academy of Mathematics and the Journal of the Indian Mathematical Society.
