= ICTP Ramanujan Prize =

Award in maths

Ramanujan Prize for Young Mathematicians
- DST-ICTP-IMU Ramanujan Prize for Young Mathematicians from Developing Countries
- Sponsored by: International Centre for Theoretical Physics (ICTP), Department of Science and Technology of the Government of India (DST), International Mathematical Union (IMU)
- Eligibility: "less than 45 years of age on 31 December of the year of the award and has conducted outstanding research in developing countries"
- Rewards: Lecture and US$15,000 to support the research of the recipient
- First award: 2005

The DST-ICTP-IMU Ramanujan Prize for Young Mathematicians from Developing Countries is a mathematics prize awarded annually by the International Centre for Theoretical Physics in Italy. The prize is named after the Indian mathematician Srinivasa Ramanujan. It was founded in 2004, and was first awarded in 2005.

The prize is awarded to a researcher from a developing country less than 45 years of age who has conducted outstanding research in a developing country. The prize is supported by the Ministry of Science and Technology (India) and Norwegian Academy of Science and Letters through the Abel Fund, with the cooperation of the International Mathematical Union.

== List of winners ==
Year	Winner	Country	Ref
2005	Marcelo Viana	Brazil
2006	Ramdorai Sujatha	India
2007	Jorge Lauret	Argentina
2008	Enrique Pujals	Brazil
2009	Ernesto Lupercio	Mexico
2010	Shi Yuguang	China
2011	Philibert Nang	Gabon
2012	Fernando Codá Marques	Brazil
2013	Tian Ye	China
2014	Miguel Walsh	Argentina
2015	Amalendu Krishna	India
2016	Chenyang Xu	China
2017	Eduardo V. Teixeira	Brazil
2018	Ritabrata Munshi	India
2019	Hoàng Hiệp Phạm	Vietnam
2020	Carolina Araujo	Brazil
2021	Neena Gupta	India
2022	Mouhamed Moustapha Fall	Senegal
2023	Not awarded
2024	Ruochuan Liu	China
2025	Claudio Muñoz	Chile
2026	Mahesh Kakde	India

== See also ==
- SASTRA Ramanujan Prize
- List of mathematics awards
