= Iris Radisch =

German literature-journalist (born 1959)

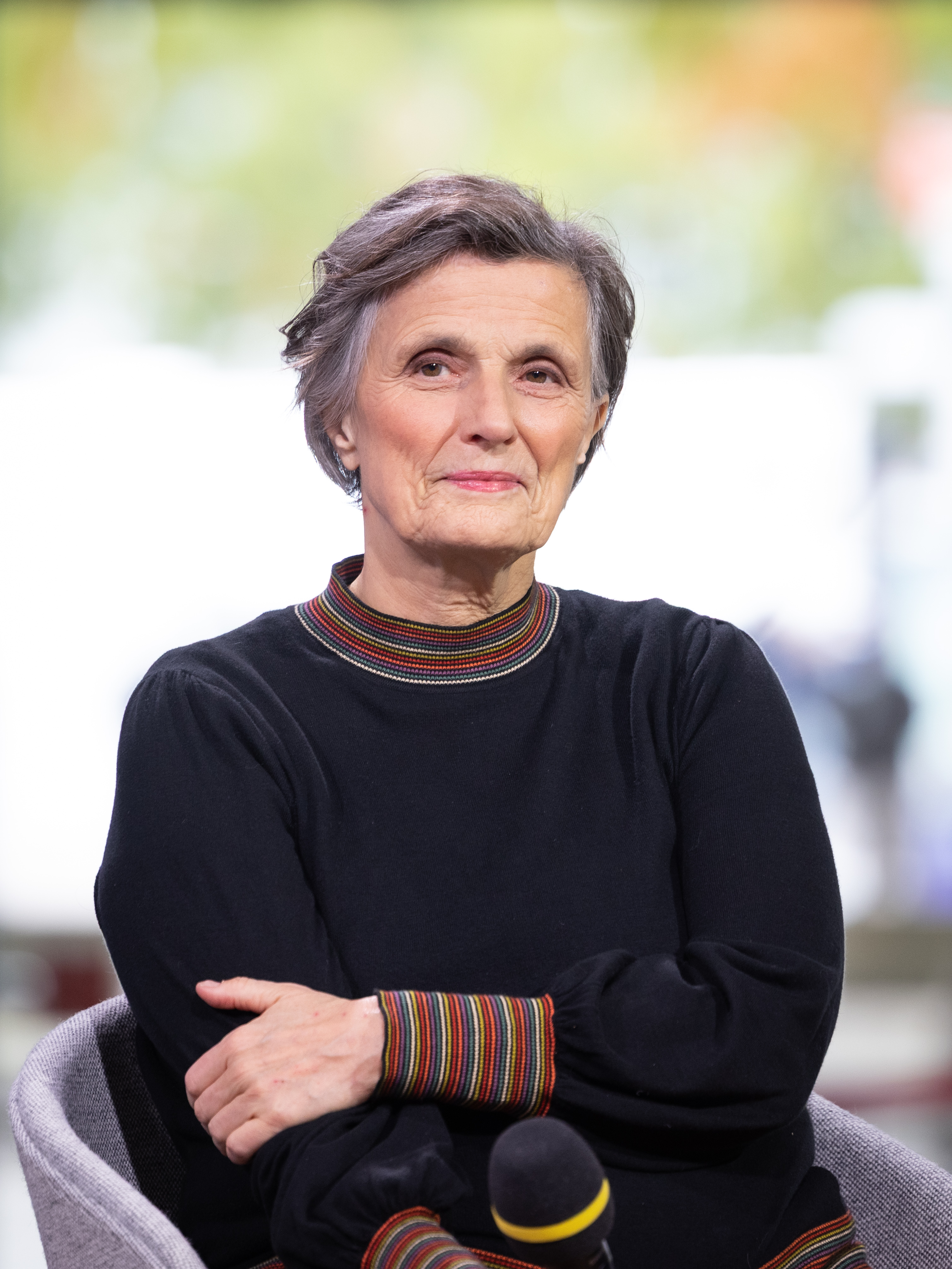
- Radisch at the Frankfurt Book Fair 2025
- Born: 2 July 1959 (age 67); West Berlin, West Germany
- Education: Frankfurt; Tübingen
- Occupations: Literature journalist Television moderator Author
- Spouse: Eberhard Rathgeb
- Children: 3 daughters

Iris Radisch (born 2 July 1959) is a German literature-journalist. Since 1990 she has written for the mass-circulation weekly newspaper, Die Zeit. More recently she has come to wider prominence through her television work.

== Biography ==
Iris Radisch was born in West Berlin (as it was known at that time). She attended university at Frankfurt and Tübingen, studying German studies, Romance studies and Philosophy. She then moved into journalism, working as a literary editor with the Frankfurter Rundschau, a mass-market daily newspaper. Her switch to Die Zeit came in 1990. As a regular contributor to the paper's Feuilleton (arts and literature) section she gained a reputation as a perceptive, original, but sometimes also starkly polemical literature critic, able to deliver her judgments with a rare level of authority. She was able to combine her journalism with guest professorships, notably at Saint Louis University and at University of Göttingen. She also began to appear as a television moderator in discussion programmes transmitted by ZDF, ARD, WDR and the private-sector broadcaster VOX.

Her public profile rose after August 2000 when she began her involvement with Das Literarische Quartett (The Literary Quartet), a weekly television program produced by West Germany's ZDF broadcasting operator in collaboration (at that time) with Austria's ORF. The program presented book reviews provided (and argued over) by a permanent panel of four literary critics. Radisch took the place vacated through the well publicised resignation from the program of Sigrid Löffler. She remained a panel member till December 2001 when (temporarily, as it later turned out) the series came to an end. She also participated in a number of subsequent "one-off" episodes transmitted during 2005 and 2006 to celebrate anniversaries of Friedrich Schiller, Thomas Mann, Heinrich Heine und Bertolt Brecht.

During 2002/2003, she teamed up with the philosopher-journalist Gert Scobel, the longstanding moderator of the television arts magazine Kulturzeit, as an alternate presenter of the literary radio programme "Bücher, Bücher" from Hessischer Rundfunk. From August 2006 till September 2012 she "fronted" Swiss Television's Literaturclub show in succession to Roger Willemsen.

Between 1995 and 2000, Radisch served on the jury for the Ingeborg Bachmann Prize, a literary prize centred on German language literature and awarded each year, since 1977, in Klagenfurt. She returned to the prize jury a few years later, chairing it between 2003 and 2007.

In 2007, Iris Radisch published her first book, "Die Schule der Frauen" (loosely "The women's school"). It was not the first time the title had been used, but Radisch's book covers and builds on more contemporary and pressing themes than the similarly titled works of Molière and Gide. "I have three children and one professional job and I am not a believer in simple solutions" (""Ich habe drei Kinder und einen Beruf und ich glaube nicht an einfache Lösungen"). The author illuminates her own experience of sustaining a professional career with her "career" as a mother of three small children by two different men. She "exposes modern myths" about the compatibility of family and profession. She discusses the semi-detached contributions of fathers.

Since April 2013, jointly with Adam Soboczynski, she has headed up Die Zeit's Feuilleton section.

== Celebration ==
In 2008 the Gesellschaft für deutsche Sprache awarded her the Medienpreis für Sprachkultur for her work on Die Zeit. In 2009 the French Culture Minister, Christine Albanel, made her a Chevalier des Arts et Lettres.

== Output (selection) ==
- Die Seele Europas und die kleine Heimat. Keiner kommt hier lebend raus. Zwei Texte. Wieser, Klagenfurt 2006, ISBN 3-85129-600-1.
- Die Schule der Frauen. Wie wir die Familie neu erfinden. DVA, München 2007, ISBN 3-421-04258-6.
  - Taschenbuchausgabe (paperback edition): Goldmann, München 2008, ISBN 978-3-442-15506-4.
- Camus: Das Ideal der Einfachheit. Eine Biographie. Rowohlt, Berlin 2013, ISBN 978-3-498-05789-3.
  - Taschenbuchausgabe (paperback edition): Rowohlt, Reinbek bei Hamburg 2014, ISBN 978-3-499-62801-6.
- Warum die Franzosen so gute Bücher schreiben: von Sartre bis Houellebecq. Rowohlt, Reinbek bei Hamburg 2017, ISBN 978-3-498-05814-2.
