= Ruochuan Liu =

Chinese mathematician specializing in number theory

- 刘若川
- Born: China
- Education: Peking University (BS, MS); Massachusetts Institute of Technology (PhD)
- Known for: p-adic Hodge theory; Relative p-adic Hodge theory; p-adic Riemann-Hilbert correspondence
- Awards: IMO Gold Medal (1999); National Science Fund for Distinguished Young Scholars (2017); Tencent Xplorer Prize (2019); China Youth Science and Technology Award (2020); Ramanujan Prize (2024)
- Scientific career
- Fields: Mathematics
- Workplaces: Peking University; University of Michigan
- Thesis: On the slope filtration of phi-modules over the Robba ring (2008)
- Doctoral advisor: Kiran Sridhara Kedlaya

Ruochuan Liu (Chinese: 刘若川; pinyin: Liú Ruòchuān) is a Chinese mathematician and a Boya Distinguished Professor at Peking University, specialising in number theory and arithmetic geometry. He is best known for his fundamental contributions to p-adic Hodge theory, for which he was awarded the 2024 ICTP Ramanujan Prize.

== Education and early life ==
Liu first gained international recognition by winning a gold medal for China at the 1999 International Mathematical Olympiad. He attended Peking University, where he completed his bachelor's and master's degrees in mathematics. Liu then pursued his doctoral studies at the Massachusetts Institute of Technology (MIT), earning his PhD in 2008 under the supervision of Kiran Sridhara Kedlaya.

== Career ==
After completing his PhD, Liu held a postdoctoral position at the University of Michigan. He later returned to China, joining the faculty at the School of Mathematical Sciences at Peking University, where he now serves as Vice Dean and a Boya Distinguished Professor.

== Research ==
Liu's research focuses on the intersection of number theory and arithmetic geometry, with a particular emphasis on p-adic methods. The citation for his Ramanujan Prize noted his "fundamental contributions to p-adic Hodge theory, especially his foundational study of relative p-adic Hodge theory and his remarkable work on rigidity and the Riemann-Hilbert correspondence for p-adic local systems." His work applies tools with geometric origins to solve problems in number theory and explores connections between p-adic geometry and algebraic topology.

== Awards and honours ==
Liu's research has been widely recognized with several awards.

- In 1999, he won a gold medal at the International Mathematical Olympiad.
- In 2017, he received the National Science Fund Award for Distinguished Young Scholars.
- In 2019, he was a recipient of the Tencent Xplorer Prize.
- In 2020, he received the China Youth Science and Technology Award.
- In 2024, he was awarded the ICTP Ramanujan Prize by the International Centre for Theoretical Physics.
