= Vasudevan Srinivas =

Indian mathematician

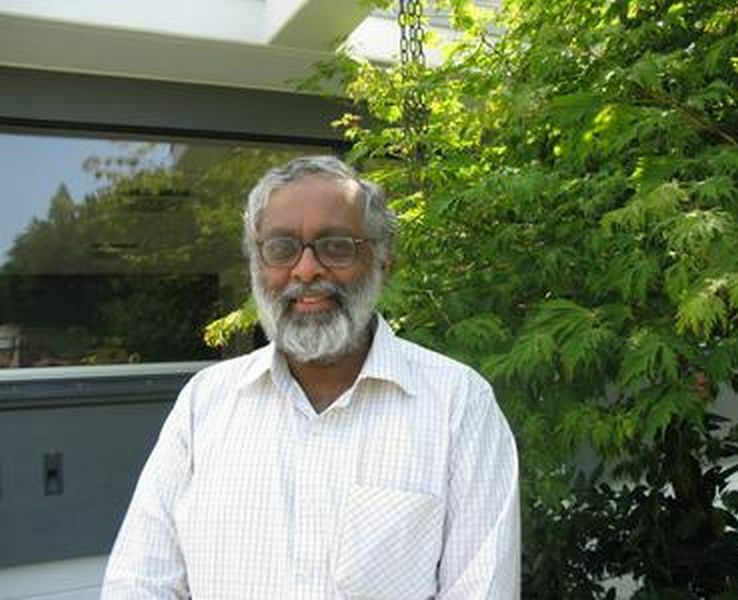
- Srinivas in 2009
- Born: 6 June 1958 (age 68)
- Education: Bangalore University; University of Chicago
- Awards: Shanti Swarup Bhatnagar Prize (2003)
- Scientific career
- Fields: Algebraic geometry in mathematics
- Workplaces: Tata Institute of Fundamental Research
- Doctoral advisor: Spencer Janney Bloch
- Doctoral students: Amalendu Krishna

Vasudevan Srinivas (born 6 June 1958) is an Indian mathematician working in algebraic geometry. He is a Distinguished Professor in the School of Mathematics Tata Institute of Fundamental Research, Mumbai. Srinivas is an elected Fellow of the Third World Academy of Sciences, American Mathematical Society, Indian National Science Academy, and the Indian Academy of Sciences.

Srinivas received the BSc degree from Bangalore University and did his MS (1978) and PhD (1982) degrees at the University of Chicago. Spencer Bloch was his research supervisor. He began his academic career at the Tata Institute of Fundamental Research, Mumbai in 1983.

== Career ==
=== Mathematical contributions ===
Srinivas works in the field of algebraic geometry; his particular subfields of interest include the areas of algebraic cycles, K-theory, commutative algebra and positive characteristic methods. He is well-known for the Bloch-Srinivas method of diagonal decomposition to study algebraic cycles. He has also made outstanding contributions to the study of algebraic cycles on singular varieties, an area of which he is essentially an originator. Among some of his other contributions are the resolution of the Zariski problem for linear systems (in collaboration with Steven Dale Cutkosky), the characterization of the projecive space among homogeneous spaces (in collaboration with Kapil Paranjape) and the characterization of rational singularities (in collaboration with Vikram Mehta).

Srinivas's book on "Algebraic K-theory" which grew out of his lectures on the topic at TIFR in 1986-87 is now a standard reference for the subject for beginning researchers in the area.

=== Service ===
Srinivas has played an important role in the promotion of mathematics through various scientific bodies, in both advisory and administrative capacities. He served on the International Mathematical Union Executive Committee from 2011 to 2018. He serves on the editorial boards of several mathematics journals. He is presently the Chairman of the National Board for Higher Mathematics, India.

=== Awards and distinctions ===
He was awarded the Shanti Swarup Bhatnagar Prize for Science and Technology in 2003, the highest science award in India, in the mathematical sciences category. In 2010, he was an invited speaker at the International Congress of Mathematicians held at Hyderabad.

==== Other awards/honours ====
- Indian National Science Academy Medal for Young Scientists, 1987
- B.M. Birla Science Prize in Mathematics for the year 1995
- Fellow of the Indian National Science Academy, New Delhi
- TWAS Prize (2008)
- Fellow of the American Mathematical Society, 2012
- Humboldt Research Award, 2013
- DFG Mercator Fellowship 2020-2024
