= Eduardo V. Teixeira =

Brazilian mathematician

- Eduardo V. Teixeira
- Born: Eduardo Vasconcelos Oliveira Teixeira; 1976 (age 49–50); São Paulo, Brazil
- Known for: Partial differential equations Free boundary problems Regularity theory Nonlinear elliptic and parabolic equations
- Awards: Mathematical Congress of the Americas Prize (2013); Member of the Brazilian Academy of Sciences (2015); ICTP–IMU Ramanujan Prize (2017)
- Scientific career
- Fields: Mathematics
- Workplaces: Oklahoma State University; University of Central Florida; Federal University of Ceará; Rutgers University
- Doctoral advisor: Luis Caffarelli

Eduardo Vasconcelos Oliveira Teixeira (born 1976), known professionally as Eduardo V. Teixeira, is a Brazilian mathematician whose research focuses on partial differential equations (PDEs), free boundary problems, and regularity theory. He is the Grayce B. Kerr Professor of Mathematics at Oklahoma State University, a position to which he was appointed in 2025.

Teixeira received the Mathematical Congress of the Americas Prize in 2013 and the ICTP–IMU Ramanujan Prize in 2017 for his work in mathematical analysis and partial differential equations. He was elected a permanent member of the Brazilian Academy of Sciences in 2015.

== Early life and education ==
Teixeira was born in São Paulo in 1976 and moved with his family to Fortaleza, in the Brazilian state of Ceará, at the age of seven. He studied mathematics at the Federal University of Ceará (UFC), receiving his bachelor's degree in 1999 and master's degree in 2001.

He obtained his PhD in mathematics from the University of Texas at Austin in 2005, under the supervision of mathematician Luis Caffarelli.

== Career ==
Following his doctorate, Teixeira held a three-year Hill Assistant Professorship at Rutgers University from 2005 to 2008. He returned to Brazil in 2008, joining the Federal University of Ceará as an assistant professor, and became a full professor in 2010. During his time at UFC, he founded and directed a research group focused on nonlinear partial differential equations, which the International Mathematical Union described as one of the major groups in the field in Latin America.

In 2017, Teixeira joined the University of Central Florida as a professor of mathematics. He remained at UCF until 2025, when he moved to Oklahoma State University and was appointed Grayce B. Kerr Professor of Mathematics.

In April 2026, New York University announced that a research team including Teixeira had been selected for the inaugural cohort of the Defense Advanced Research Projects Agency's Exponentiating Mathematics (expMath) program. The project aims to develop artificial intelligence assistants capable of working alongside mathematicians, including helping to translate informal mathematical proofs into formally verified mathematics.

== Research ==
Teixeira's mathematical research focuses on the regularity of solutions to nonlinear elliptic and parabolic partial differential equations, as well as free boundary problems. According to the citation for the 2017 Ramanujan Prize, he began studying free boundary problems during his doctoral research, establishing existence and regularity results for nonlinear heat conduction. He subsequently developed an approach to the regularity of degenerate elliptic equations in which the set of critical points of a solution is treated as a free boundary.

His research with Lei Zhang established Almgren-type frequency formulas on Riemannian manifolds. His work also included a proof of a continuity conjecture for elliptic equations with higher-order singular structures and, with Damião Araújo and José Miguel Urbano, a resolution of an optimal-regularity conjecture for the p-Laplacian in two dimensions.

In collaboration with Zheng-Chao Han and Yanyan Li, Teixeira studied the asymptotic behavior of solutions to the σ_{k}-Yamabe equation near isolated singularities.

In 2020, he published an introductory survey of regularity theory for nonlinear diffusion processes in the Notices of the American Mathematical Society.

== Awards and honors ==
- 2013: Mathematical Congress of the Americas Prize (MCA Prize).
- 2015: Elected a permanent member of the Brazilian Academy of Sciences.
- 2017: ICTP–IMU Ramanujan Prize for Young Mathematicians from Developing Countries, awarded in recognition of his contributions to mathematical analysis and partial differential equations.
- 2011–2015: Young affiliate of The World Academy of Sciences (TWAS).
- 2023: Received the honorary title of citizen of Ceará. The title was granted under Ceará State Law No. 17,583 of 3 August 2021 and formally conferred at a ceremony in the state's Legislative Assembly on 15 March 2023.

== Selected publications ==
- Han, Zheng-Chao; Li, Yanyan; Teixeira, Eduardo V. (2010). "Asymptotic behavior of solutions to the σ_{k}-Yamabe equation near isolated singularities". Inventiones Mathematicae. 182 (3): 635–684. doi:10.1007/s00222-010-0274-7.
- Araújo, Damião J.; Teixeira, Eduardo V.; Urbano, José Miguel (2017). "A proof of the C^{p′}-regularity conjecture in the plane". Advances in Mathematics. 316: 541–553. doi:10.1016/j.aim.2017.06.027.
- Teixeira, Eduardo V. (2020). "Regularity Theory for Nonlinear Diffusion Processes". Notices of the American Mathematical Society. 67 (4): 475–483. doi:10.1090/noti2057.
- Botelho, Geraldo; Pellegrino, Daniel; Teixeira, Eduardo V. (2025). Introduction to Functional Analysis. Universitext. Springer. ISBN 978-3-031-81790-8.
