= Miguel Walsh =

Argentine mathematician

- Born: Buenos Aires, Argentina
- Education: University of Buenos Aires
- Known for: Walsh's ergodic theorem
- Awards: Clay Research Fellowship (2014); ICTP Ramanujan Prize (2014); ICM Invited Speaker (2018); Salem Prize (2024)
- Scientific career
- Fields: Mathematics
- Workplaces: Merton College, Oxford; University of Buenos Aires
- Doctoral advisor: Román Sasyk

Miguel Nicolás Walsh is an Argentine mathematician working in number theory and ergodic theory. He is a professor at the University of Buenos Aires.

== Education and career ==
Walsh has previously held a Clay Research Fellowship and was a fellow of Merton College at the University of Oxford. He is a professor of mathematics at the University of Buenos Aires.

He was also Member of the Mathematical Sciences Research Institute at Berkeley, Senior Fellow of the Institute for Pure and Applied Mathematics at UCLA and von Neumann Fellow of the Institute for Advanced Study at Princeton.

Walsh was born in Buenos Aires, Argentina. He obtained his undergraduate degree in 2010 from the University of Buenos Aires and his PhD, also from the same institution, in 2012.

== Recognition ==
He received the MCA Prize in 2013. In 2014, he was awarded the ICTP Ramanujan Prize for his contributions to mathematics. He is the youngest recipient to date of both awards.

In June 2017 Walsh was invited to present his research at the 2018 International Congress of Mathematicians in Rio de Janeiro, Brazil. In 2021, he was selected as Plenary Speaker of the Mathematical Congress of the Americas.

In 2024, he was awarded the inaugural IMSA Prize of the Institute of the Mathematical Sciences of America during the Mathematical Waves Conference in Miami. That same year, he received the UMALCA Award of the Mathematical Union of Latin America and the Caribbean.

He is one of two 2024 recipients of the Salem Prize, given "for contributions to ergodic theory, analytic number theory, and the development of the polynomial method, including a convergence theorem for nonconventional ergodic averages, bounds on the local Fourier uniformity of multiplicative functions, and bounds on rational points on varieties".

== Selected publications ==
- Walsh, Miguel N. (2020-11-01). "The polynomial method over varieties". Inventiones Mathematicae. 222 (2): 469–512. arXiv:1811.07865. Bibcode:2020InMat.222..469W. doi:10.1007/s00222-020-00975-6. ISSN 1432-1297. S2CID 119650372.
- Walsh, Miguel N. (2014-04-29). "The algebraicity of ill-distributed sets". Geometric and Functional Analysis. 24 (3): 959–967. arXiv:1307.0259. doi:10.1007/s00039-014-0286-3. ISSN 1016-443X. S2CID 119695020.
- Walsh, Miguel N. (2012-01-01). "Norm convergence of nilpotent ergodic averages". Annals of Mathematics. 175 (3): 1667–1688. arXiv:1109.2922. doi:10.4007/annals.2012.175.3.15. S2CID 55768070.
- Walsh, Miguel N. (2012-07-15). "The inverse sieve problem in high dimensions". Duke Mathematical Journal. 161 (10): 2001–2022. arXiv:1105.1551. doi:10.1215/00127094-1645788. hdl:11336/68296. ISSN 0012-7094. S2CID 119317224.
