= International Journal of Number Theory =

- Discipline: Mathematics
- Language: English, French
- Edited by: Yann Bugeaud, Michael Filaseta, Ramdorai Sujatha, Ae Ja Yee

Publication details
- History: 2005-present
- Publisher: World Scientific
- Frequency: 8/year
- Impact factor: 0.462 (2014)

Standard abbreviations
- ISO 4: Int. J. Number Theory

Indexing
- ISSN: 1793-0421 (print); 1793-7310 (web)
- OCLC no.: 62161796

Links
- Journal homepage

The International Journal of Number Theory was established in 2005 and is published by World Scientific. It covers number theory, encompassing areas such as analytic number theory, diophantine equations, and modular forms.

According to the Journal Citation Reports, the journal has a 2020 impact factor of 0.674.

== Abstracting and indexing ==
The journal is abstracted and indexed in Zentralblatt MATH, Mathematical Reviews, Science Citation Index Expanded, and Current Contents/Physical, Chemical and Earth Sciences.
