= Phạm Hoàng Hiệp =

Vietnamese Mathematician

Pham Hoang Hiep
- Education: Aix-Marseille University; Umea University; Hanoi National University of Education
- Scientific career
- Thesis: Dirichlet's problem in Pluripotential Theory (2008)
- Doctoral advisor: Urban Cegrell
- Other academic advisors: Per Åhag, Anders Fällström

Pham Hoang Hiep is a Vietnamese mathematician known for his work in complex analysis. He is a professor at the Vietnam Academy of Science and Technology and director of the International Centre for Mathematical Research and Training. He was awarded the 2015 Prof. Ta Quang Buu prize (young prize) and the 2019 ICTP Ramanujan Prize.

== Research and career ==
Pham Hoang Hiep graduated from Hanoi National University of Education in 2004 and obtained his PhD at Umea University in 2008. He obtained a doctorate in science at Aix-Marseille University in 2013. He is known for being the youngest full professor in Vietnam. He is on the editorial board of Acta Mathematica Vietnamica

Pham has worked on plurisubharmonic functions and (with Jean-Pierre Demailly) found a lower-bound on the log canonical threshold of such a function. If $\phi$ is such a function then Pham and Demailly found a sharp inequality on the largest constant, c, so that $e^{-2 c \phi}$ is integrable in the neighbourhood of a singularity. Pham later also worked on the "weighted log canonical threshold", which pertains to the integrability properties of $f^2 e^{-2 c \phi}$ for a fixed holomorphic function f.

== Awards and honours ==
- 2015 Ta Quang Buu Prize for his paper on "A sharp lower bound for the log canonical threshold" (2014)
- 2019 ICTP-Ramanujan Prize for "outstanding contributions to the field of complex analysis, and in particular to pluripotential theory".
- 2020 Asian Scientist 100

== Selected publications ==
- Åhag, Per; Cegrell, Urban; Czyż, Rafał; Phạm, Hoàng Hiệp (1 December 2009). "Monge–Ampère measures on pluripolar sets". Journal de Mathématiques Pures et Appliquées. 92 (6): 613–627. arXiv:0706.0169. doi:10.1016/j.matpur.2009.06.001.
- Demailly, Jean-Pierre; Dinew, Sławomir; Guedj, Vincent; Hiep, Pham Hoang; Kołodziej, Sławomir; Zeriahi, Ahmed (2014). "Hölder continuous solutions to Monge–Ampère equations". Journal of the European Mathematical Society. 16 (4): 619–647. arXiv:1112.1388. doi:10.4171/JEMS/442.
- Hiep, Pham Hoang (1 April 2014). "The weighted log canonical threshold". Comptes Rendus Mathematique. 352 (4): 283–288. arXiv:1401.4833. doi:10.1016/j.crma.2014.02.010. S2CID 119149696.
- Demailly, Jean-Pierre; Phạm, Hoàng Hiệp (2014). "A sharp lower bound for the log canonical threshold". Acta Mathematica. 212 (1): 1–9. arXiv:1201.4086. doi:10.1007/s11511-014-0107-4.
