= Pierre Bieliavsky =

Belgian mathematician (born 1970)

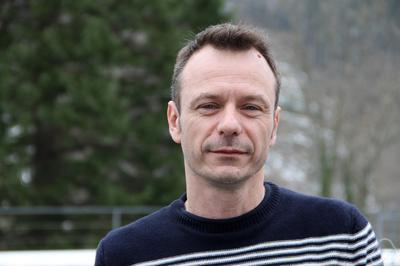
- Bieliavsky in 2015
- Born: 1970 (age 55–56); Brussels, Belgium
- Occupation: Mathematician

Pierre Bieliavsky (born 1970 in Brussels, Belgium), is a Belgian mathematician.

== Biography ==
Pierre Bieliavsky graduated from the Université libre de Bruxelles in 1991. He completed a doctorate in 1995 under the supervision of Michel Cahen at the Université libre de Bruxelles on Symmetric symplectic spaces.

He is currently professor of mathematics at the Université catholique de Louvain. His research subjects are theory of symmetric space, harmonic analysis, noncommutative geometry and mathematical physics.

== Prizes ==
- Prix Eugène-Catalan from the Royal Academy of Science, Letters and Fine Arts of Belgium (2015)

== Publications ==
- with Victor Gayral, Deformation Quantization for Actions of Kählerian Lie Groups, Volume 236, Number 1115, Memoirs of the American Mathematical Society (2014)
- Semisimple symplectic symmetric spaces, Geom. Dedicata 73 (1998), no. 3, 245–273.
- Symmetric spaces and star representations, Advances in Geometry, Progr. Math. 172, Birkhauser (Boston), 1999, 71–82.
- Strict quantization of solvable symmetric spaces, Journal of Symplectic Geometry 1 (2002), no. 2, 269–320. (math.QA/0010004.)
- with Y. Maeda, Convergent star product algebras on "$ax+b$", Lett. Math. Phys. 62 (2002), no. 3, 233–243.
- with M. Massar, Oscillatory integral formulae for left-invariant star products on a class of Lie groups, Lett. Math. Phys. 58 (2001), no. 2, 115–128.
- with M. Rooman, Ph. Spindel, Regular Poisson structures on massive non-rotating BTZ black holes, Nuclear Physics B 645 (2002), no. 1-2, 349–364.
- with M.Pevzner, Symmetric spaces and star representations III. The Poincarré disk, Noncommutative Harmonic Analysis, Progress in Mathematics, 220, Birkhäuser Boston, P. Delorme, M. Vergne eds (2004). (math.RT/0209206).
