= Xobdo.org =

Online multilingual dictionary

- Screenshot of XOBDO's welcome page
- Website type: Online Dictionary
- Available in: Assamese, Meitei, Karbi, Dimasa, Mising, Hindi and Bengali languages
- Owner: online community
- Creator: Bikram M. Baruah
- Website: http://xobdo.org/
- Commercial: No
- Registration: Optional

Xobdo.org is an online multilingual dictionary. It provides information on the vocabularies of Assamese, Boro, Meitei, Karbi, Dimasa, Mising, Hindi and Bengali languages. It is the first online Assamese dictionary to become available online, starting on 10 March 2006. As of 6 August 2011, the database of this dictionary contains 37,013 Assamese words. This is a wiki where anybody can contribute and edit words in the dictionary provided they have a substantial knowledge of the Assamese language. Moreover, the dictionary has the facility to categorize the words as per their origin, nature and locality. It also has the facility of incorporating encyclopedic entries. This website uses Unicode fonts which ensures global visibility of Assamese fonts when users set their character encoding option to Unicode (UTF-8).

The dictionary is the brainchild of Bikram M Baruah, an Assamese petroleum engineer based in Abu Dhabi. Later, many interested people specialized in different areas joined as contributors to the dictionary.

== Authorship and management ==
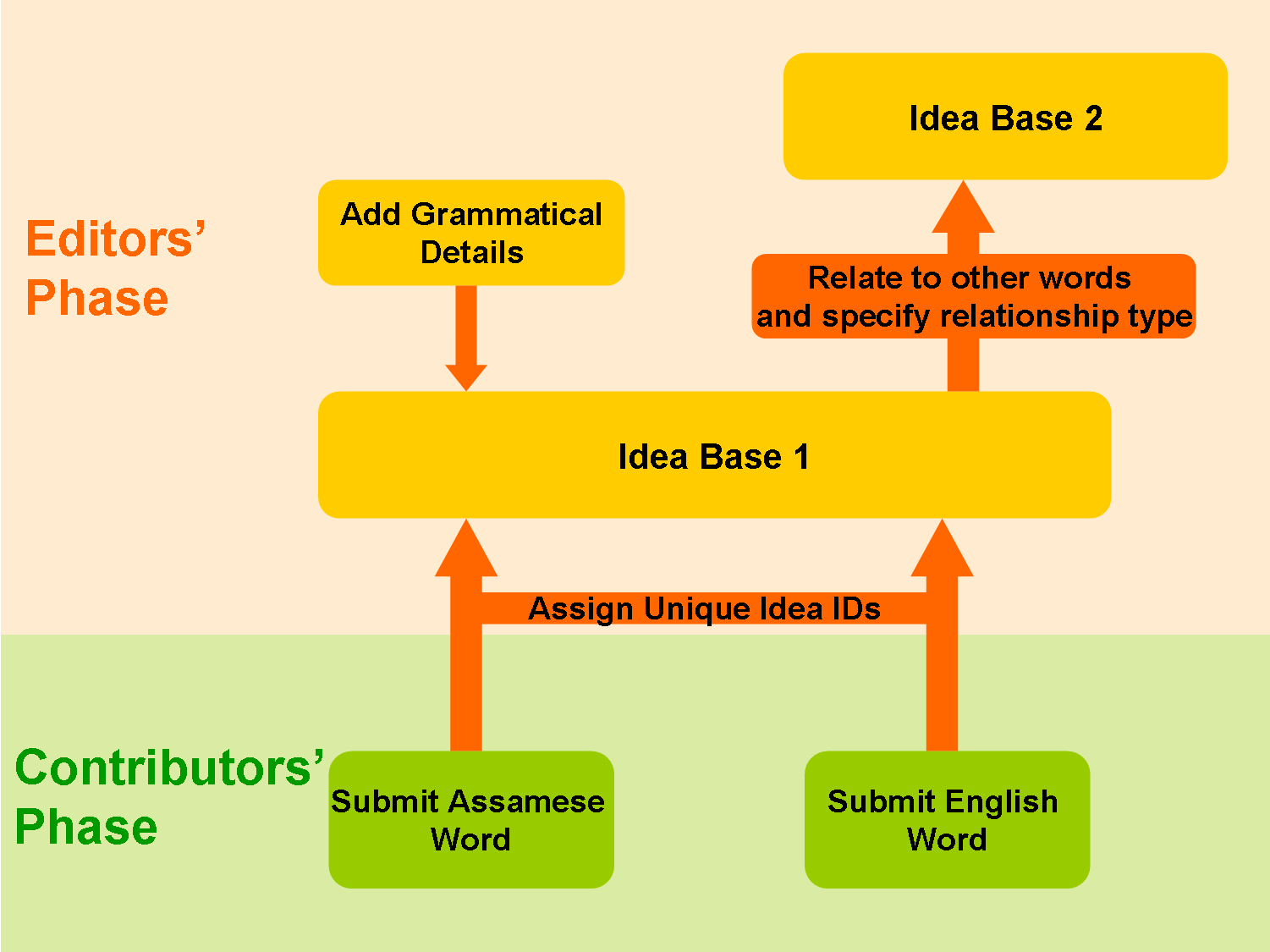
Database Architecture of xobdo.org

A group of volunteers are responsible for adding words at XOBDO database. As of now the website has two levels of volunteers: "contributors" and "editors". A contributor enters an English and its corresponding Assamese word to the temporary database. Afterwards an editor assigns a unique "idea ID" to the corresponding English and Assamese words and carries on other editing works, if required, to match the standards of XOBDO. After assigning the idea ID the words are added to the main database ready to be retrieved by a user.

== Technical details ==
Initially xobdo.org employed Microsoft server tools and technologies. It ran ASP on Windows IIS and the primary database on RDBMS based on Microsoft SQL Server. However, in 2007, it moved to open source technology and started running PHPs on Apache and an RDBMS on MySQL.

== See also ==
- Meitei language in Assam
