= Ramaiyengar Sridharan =

Indian mathematician (born 1935)

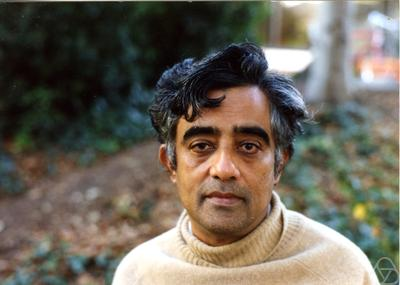
- R. Sridharan in 1990
- Born: 1935 (age 90–91); Cuddalore, India
- Education: Columbia University
- Awards: Shanti Swarup Bhatnagar Award
- Scientific career
- Fields: Mathematics
- Workplaces: TIFR
- Doctoral advisor: Samuel Eilenberg
- Doctoral students: Raman Parimala

Ramaiyengar Sridharan is a mathematician at Chennai Mathematical Institute, formerly at the Tata Institute of Fundamental Research (TIFR).

== Early life ==
He was born in Cuddalore in 1935. He obtained his Ph.D. from Columbia under the guidance of Samuel Eilenberg with his thesis on filtered algebras and representations of Lie algebras in 1960.

== Awards ==
Sridharan was awarded the Shanti Swarup Bhatnagar Prize for Science and Technology (SSB prize) in Mathematical Science in 1980.

== Selected publications ==
- Filtered algebras and representations of Lie algebras, R Sridharan - Transactions of the American Mathematical Society, 1961 - jstor.org
- On the global dimension of some algebras, MP Murthy, R Sridharan - Mathematische Zeitschrift, 1963 - Springer
