= Sujatha Ramdorai =

Indian mathematician (born 1962)

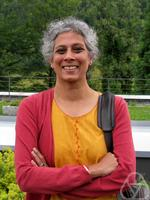
- Sujatha Ramdorai
- Born: 1962
- Citizenship: Indian
- Education: St. Joseph's College, Bangalore; Annamalai University; TIFR
- Known for: non-commutative Iwasawa theory, Arithmetic of Algebraic varieties
- Awards: ICTP Ramanujan Prize (2006); Shanti Swarup Bhatnagar Award (2004); Alexander von Humboldt Fellow (1997–1998); Padma Shri (2023)
- Scientific career
- Fields: Mathematics
- Workplaces: TIFR; University of British Columbia
- Thesis: Witt Groups of Real Surfaces and Real Geometry
- Doctoral advisor: Raman Parimala

Sujatha Ramdorai (born 1962) is an algebraic number theorist known for her work on Iwasawa theory. She is a professor of mathematics and Canada Research Chair at University of British Columbia, Canada. She was previously a professor at Tata Institute of Fundamental Research.

== Education ==
She completed her B.Sc. in 1982 at St. Joseph's college, Bangalore and then got her M.Sc. through correspondence from Annamalai University in 1985. After that she went for PhD at Tata Institute of Fundamental Research and was awarded her PhD under supervision of Raman Parimala in 1992. Her dissertation was "Witt Groups of Real Surfaces and Real Geometry".

== Career ==
Dr. Ramdorai initially worked in the areas of algebraic theory of quadratic forms and arithmetic geometry of elliptic curves. Together with Coates, Fukaya, Kato, and Venjakob she formulated a non-commutative version of the main conjecture of Iwasawa theory, on which much of the foundation of this important subject is based. Iwasawa theory has its origins in the work of a great Japanese mathematician, Kenkichi Iwasawa.

She holds an adjunct professorship position at Indian Institute of Science Education and Research, Pune.

Working with her husband Srinivasan Ramdorai and Indian mathematics writer V.S. Sastry, Sujatha Ramdorai conceived of and partially funded the Ramanujan Math Park in Chittoor, Andhra Pradesh, which was inaugurated at the end of 2017. The park is dedicated to mathematics education and honors the great Indian mathematician Srinivasa Ramanujan (1887-1920).

She is a member of the Scientific Committee of several international research agencies such as the Indo-French Centre for Promotion of Advanced Research, Banff International Research Station, International Centre for Pure and Applied Mathematics. She was a member of the National Knowledge Commission from 2007 to 2009. She is at present a member of the Prime Minister's Scientific Advisory Council from 2009 onwards and also a member of the National Innovation Council. She is also on the advisory board of Gonit Sora.

== Awards and honors ==
Ramdorai became the first Indian to win the prestigious ICTP Ramanujan Prize in 2006. She was also awarded the Shanti Swarup Bhatnagar Award, the highest honour in scientific fields by the Indian Government in 2004. She is also the recipient of the 2020 Krieger–Nelson Prize for her exceptional contributions to mathematics research. She has been bestowed with Padma Shri award by the Government of India for 2023 in the field of science and engineering.

== Editorial position ==
- Managing editor, International Journal of Number Theory (IJNT)
- Editor, Journal of Ramanujan Mathematical Society (JRMS)
- Associate editor, Expositiones Mathematicae
