= Raman Parimala =

Indian mathematician (born 1948)

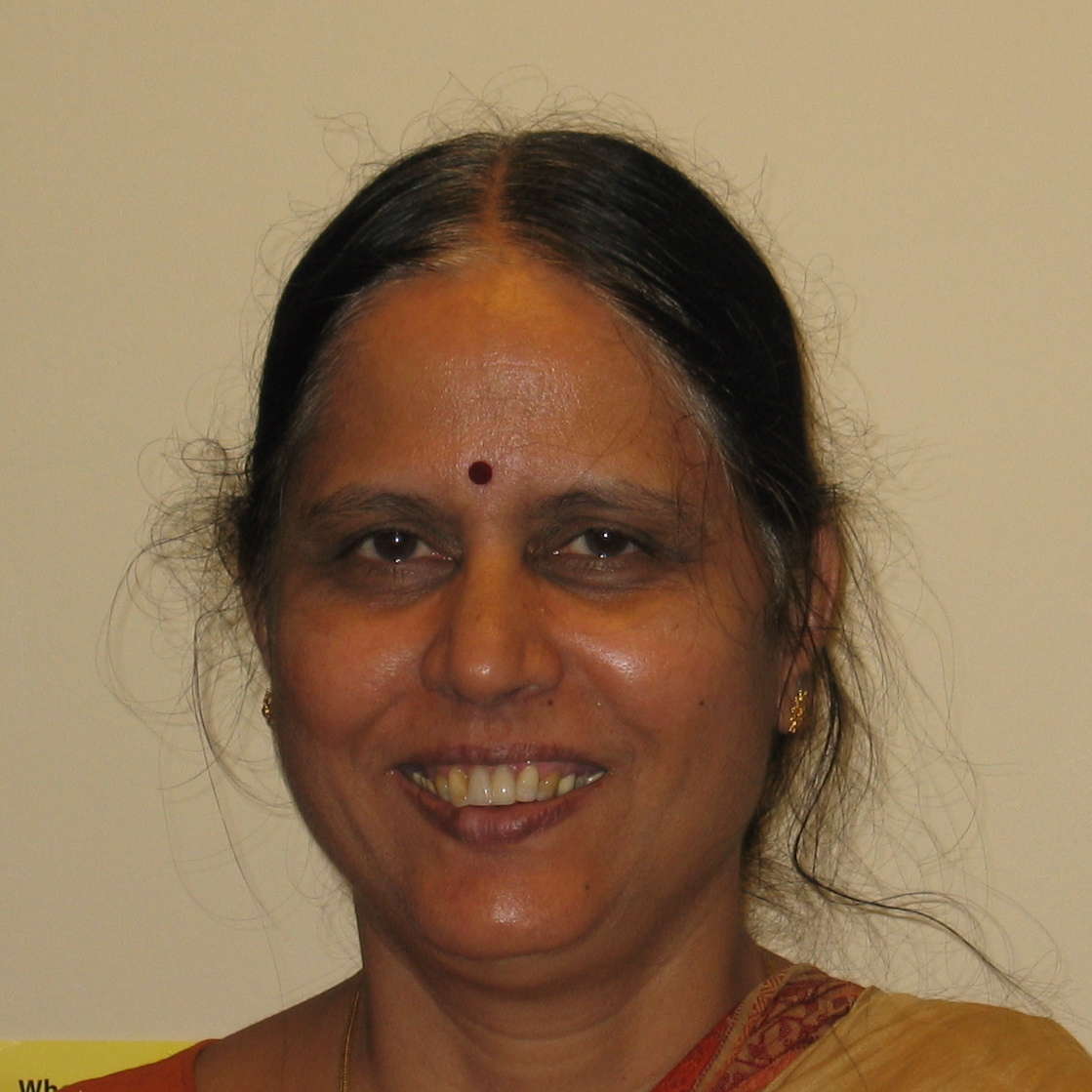
- Born: 21 November 1948 (age 77)
- Education: University of Mumbai, Tata Institute of Fundamental Research
- Awards: Shanti Swarup Bhatnagar Award (1987)
- Scientific career
- Fields: Algebra
- Workplaces: Emory University
- Doctoral advisor: R. Sridharan
- Doctoral students: Sujatha Ramdorai; Suresh Venapally

Raman Parimala (born 21 November 1948) is an Indian mathematician known for her contributions to algebra. She is the Arts & Sciences Distinguished Professor of mathematics at Emory University. For many years, she was a professor at Tata Institute of Fundamental Research (TIFR), Mumbai.

She was on the Mathematical Sciences jury for the Infosys Prize 2019—2022 and was on the Abel Prize selection Committee 2021–2023.

== Background ==
Parimala was born and raised in Tamil Nadu, India. She studied in Saradha Vidyalaya Girls' High School and Stella Maris College at Chennai. She received her B. Sc. in 1968 and her M.Sc. in 1970 from Madras University. In 1976, Parimala earned her Ph.D. from the University of Mumbai; her advisor was R. Sridharan from TIFR.

In 1987, she won the highest science award in India: The Shanti Swarup Bhatnagar Prize.

She is a fellow of the Indian National Science Academy (New Delhi).

== Selected publications ==
- 2021: "Local triviality for G-torsors", Gille, P.; Parimala, R.; Suresh, V., Math. Ann. 380, no. 1-2, 539–567. MR 4263691
- 2018: "Local-global principle for reduced norms over function fields of p-adic curves", Parimala, R.; Preeti, R.; Suresh, V., Compos. Math. 154, no. 2, 410–458. MR 3732207
- 2014: "Period-index and u-invariant questions for function fields over complete discretely valued fields", Parimala, R.; Suresh, V., Invent. Math. 197, no. 1, 215–235. MR 3219517
- 2001: "Hermitian analogue of a theorem of Springer", R Parimala, R. Sridharan, V Suresh - Journal of Algebra, - Elsevier doi:10.1006/jabr.2001.8830
- 1998: "Classical groups and the Hasse principle", E Bayer-Fluckiger, R Parimala - Annals of Mathematics, jstor.org doi:10.2307/120961
- 1995: "Galois cohomology of the classical groups over fields of cohomological dimension ≤2", Bayer-Fluckiger, E.; Parimala, R., Invent. Math. 122, no. 2, 195–229. MR 1358975
- 1990: "Real components of algebraic varieties and étale cohomology", Colliot-Thélène, J.-L.; Parimala, R., Invent. Math. 101, no. 1, 81–99. MR 1055712
- 1982: "Quadratic spaces over polynomial extensions of regular rings of dimension 2", Mathematische Annalen, vol. 261, pp. 287–292 doi:10.1007/BF01455449
- 1976: "Failure of a quadratic analogue of Serre's conjecture", Bulletin of the AMS, vol. 82, pp. 962–964, Colliot-Thélène, J.-L.; Parimala, R., Invent. Math. 101, no. 1, 81–99. MR 0419427

== Honors ==
On National Science Day in 2020, Smriti Irani, head of the Ministry of Women and Child Development of the Government of India, announced the establishment of chairs at institutes across India in the names of Raman Parimala and other ten Indian women scientists. Parimala was an invited speaker at the International Congress of Mathematicians in Zurich in 1994 and gave a talk Study of quadratic forms — some connections with geometry. She gave a plenary address Arithmetic of linear algebraic groups over two dimensional fields at the Congress in Hyderabad in 2010.

- Fellow of the Indian Academy of Sciences
- Fellow of Indian National Science Academy
- Bhatnagar Award in 1987
- Honorary Membership of the London Mathematical Society in 2024
- Honorary doctorate from the University of Lausanne in 1999
- Srinivasa Ramanujan Birth Centenary Award in 2003.
- TWAS Prize for Mathematics (2005).
- Fellow of the American Mathematical Society (2012)
