= South of the Border, West of the Sun =

1992 novel by Haruki Murakami

- First edition (Japanese)
- Author: Haruki Murakami
- Original title: 国境の南、太陽の西 (Kokkyō no Minami, Taiyō no Nishi)
- Translator: Philip Gabriel
- Language: Japanese
- Publisher: Kodansha
- Publication date: 1992
- Publication place: Japan
- English publication date: 1999 by Alfred A. Knopf
- Media type: Print (Paperback)
- Pages: 294 pages
- ISBN: 9784062060813
- OCLC: 27167197

South of the Border, West of the Sun (国境の南、太陽の西, Kokkyō no Minami, Taiyō no Nishi) is a novel by Japanese author Haruki Murakami, first published in 1992.

== Plot ==
The novel tells the story of Hajime, from his childhood in a small town in Japan to his adult years in Tokyo. He meets Shimamoto, a girl with polio and a fellow only child. They spend their time together talking about their interests in life and listening to records on Shimamoto's stereo. They are separated in their high school years, and grow apart.

They are reunited in their thirty-sixth year. Hajime is now the father of two children and owner of two successful jazz bars. Shimamoto gives no details of her own life and appears only at random intervals, haunting him as a constant "what-if". Meeting Shimamoto again sets off a chain of events that forces Hajime to choose between his young family and the magic of the past.

== Main characters ==
=== Hajime ===
Hajime grows up in a small family as an only child. Many think that not having siblings means one must be spoiled by their parents, sickly, and extremely selfish. Friendless and aloof, his life is dominated by solitude and isolation. As a university student, Hajime opposes the economical bubble of post-war Japanese capitalism. Later, with his father-in-law's capital, he opens a jazz club, and according to his benefactor's wishes invests his earnings into the stock market and real estate. Though he becomes an accomplished man, he feels something is lacking.

=== Shimamoto ===
Shimamoto is a pretty girl left lame by polio. As a fellow only child to Hajime, they become good friends. They spend long afternoons in her living room listening to Liszt and Nat King Cole on her father's stereo, and talking with a pre-adolescent openness that becomes erotic only in retrospect. They separate when entering different junior high schools, and lose touch. Later in life, Shimamoto is a beautiful, intense and mysterious woman who reveals little of her life. She is single and well-off, though she is troubled by her past loss of an infant child.

=== Yukiko ===
Yukiko is married to Hajime, yet remains a vague personality throughout the novel. Only at the end of story does Yukiko have a direct conversation with Hajime, accusing him of being egocentric and self-absorbed while ignoring the needs of others. She is a person who can express genuine love and devotion, in contrast to the self-absorption and destructiveness of Hajime's desire. Her husband's betrayal makes her desperate, though she opens her heart to accept her husband in all his frailties.

== Background ==
Murakami wrote the novel in 1992, as a visiting scholar at Princeton University. The English translation, by Philip Gabriel, was released in 1999.

The first half of the title refers to the song "South of the Border"; the story features a fictional recording by Nat King Cole. The other half of the title refers to an Inuit syndrome called Piblokto or Arctic (or Siberian) hysteria. In the novel, Shimamoto compares her ennui to "hysteria siberiana", explaining through a story:

Try to imagine this, you’re a farmer, living all alone on the Siberian tundra. Day after day you plow your fields. As far as the eye can see, nothing. To the north, the horizon, to the east, the horizon, to the south, to the west, more of the same. Every morning, when the sun rises in the east, you go out to work in your fields. When it’s directly overhead, you take a break for lunch. When it sinks in the west, you go home to sleep. In the winter they stay home and do indoor work. When spring comes, they head out to the fields again. Anyway, that cycle continues, year after year, and then one day, something inside you dies. Maybe nothing or maybe something in the west of the sun. At any rate, it’s different from south of the border.

Hajime, born in 1951, belongs to the first generation of Japanese born after World War II. Most families had at least two or three children, so Hajime is forlorn being the only child without any siblings. This situation and people’s prejudice shape his view of the world.

The author himself was an only child who operated a successful jazz bar.

== Reception ==
Publishers Weekly called the novel an "oddly gripping, often dreamlike tale" and, with its ending, demonstrative of a "more mellow aspect than his work has exhibited before."

Mary Hawthorne, in The New York Times, lauded Murakami's writing of sexuality for its ability to "make intimacy real—appealing and unembarrassing, innocent even" and that the novel was a "wise and beautiful book ... full of hidden truths."
