= Eva Bayer-Fluckiger =

Swiss mathematician

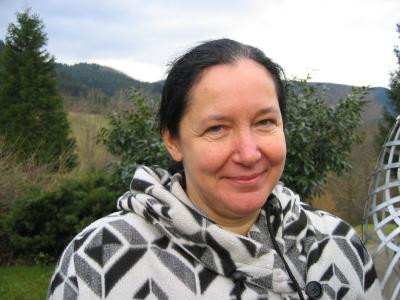
- Born: 25 June 1951 (age 75); Budapest, Hungary
- Education: University of Geneva
- Known for: Proving Serre's conjecture II
- Awards: Maria Sibylla Merian Award (2001)
- Scientific career
- Fields: Mathematics
- Workplaces: École Polytechnique Fédérale de Lausanne; University of Franche-Comté
- Doctoral advisor: Michel Kervaire

Eva Bayer-Fluckiger (born 25 June 1951) is a Hungarian and Swiss mathematician. She is a Professor Emeritus at École Polytechnique Fédérale de Lausanne. She has worked on several topics in topology, algebra and number theory, e.g. on the theory of knots, on lattices, on quadratic forms and on Galois cohomology. Along with Raman Parimala, she proved Serre's conjecture II regarding the Galois cohomology of a simply-connected semisimple algebraic group when such a group is of classical type.

== Early life and career ==
Bayer-Fluckiger was born in Budapest, Hungary. She attended the University of Geneva, where she obtained her doctorate under supervision of Michel Kervaire in 1978. She was a visiting scholar at the Institute for Advanced Study from 1983 to 1984. From 1990 to 1996, she was an executive committee member of the European Mathematical Society and since 2006 served on editorial board of its Commentarii Mathematici Helvetici.

== Awards ==
In 2001, the Essen College of Gender Studies gave Bayer-Fluckiger their Maria Sibylla Merian Prize, "for her achievements in number theory". She was Emmy Noether guest professor at the University of Göttingen in 2003. She was named a Fellow of the American Mathematical Society, in the 2022 class of fellows, "for contributions to number theory, algebra, and topology, and for service to the profession".
