= Tezpur University =

University in Assam, India

- Motto: विज्ञानं यज्ञं तनुते
- Motto in English: Specialized Knowledge Promotes Creativity
- Type: Central University
- Established: 21 January 1994 (32 years ago)
- Accreditation: A+
- Academic affiliations: UGC; AIU; ACU
- Chancellor: Governor of Assam
- Vice-Chancellor: Amarendra Kumar Das (Pro-VC)
- Visitor: President of India
- Faculty: 312 (2026)
- Administrative staff: 287 (2026)
- Total staff: 382 (2026)
- Students: 5,120 (2026)
- Undergraduates: 1,994 (2026)
- Postgraduates: 2,041 (2026)
- Location: Napaam, Tezpur, Assam, 784028, India; 26°41′47.544″N 92°50′6.09″E
- Campus: 262 acres (1.06 km^{2}); Semi-Urban
- Language: English, Assamese
- Colours
- Website: www.tezu.ernet.in

Tezpur University is a Central University located in Tezpur in the North-Eastern state of Assam, India, established by an act of Parliament, in 1994.

== History ==
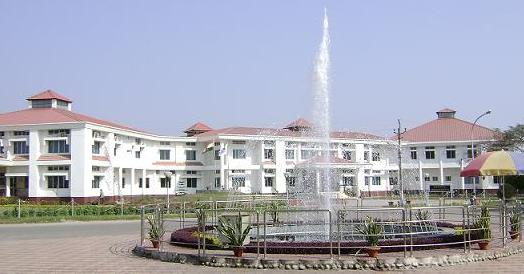
The Administration Building

The establishment of Tezpur University is considered to be one of the outcomes of the Assam Accord, along with the establishment of Assam University and IIT Guwahati.

Tezpur University was established, by an Act of Parliament, in 1994. The then prime minister of India, P. V. Narasimha Rao, chaired the opening of the university. It has its jurisdiction over whole of the state of Assam.

Initially, the university operated from the premises of the Darrang College, in Tezpur. For a while, it also operated from the Tezpur Law College premises. Land was acquired at Napaam, a suburb, which is about 15 km (9.3 mi) east of Tezpur, area totalling 262 acres (106 ha). A few months later, the premises of the university was shifted to the present permanent location.

Kalaguru Bishnuprasad Rava (Rabha) donated an ancestral estate of 2500 bigha of land received from the British government in favour of the peasants. The present-day Tezpur University stands on the land donated by him. Recently, in 2013, the university acquired an additional plot of land, extending the current plot.

== Campus ==
The university campus is at Napaam about 15 km east of Tezpur, the headquarters of the Sonitpur district of Assam. Napaam is an urban area surrounded by people of diverse caste, religion and language. The Napaam campus is on 262 acres (1.06 km^{2}) of land, bounded by pucca walls. Napaam is linked by a PWD road from the National Highway No. 37A at almost the midpoint between the Kalia-Bhomora bridge and Misson Chariali. Tezpur is linked by road and rail with the rest of the state and the country. There is a tri-weekly flight between Kolkata, Guwahati and Tezpur.

University Gate, taken from outside the campus

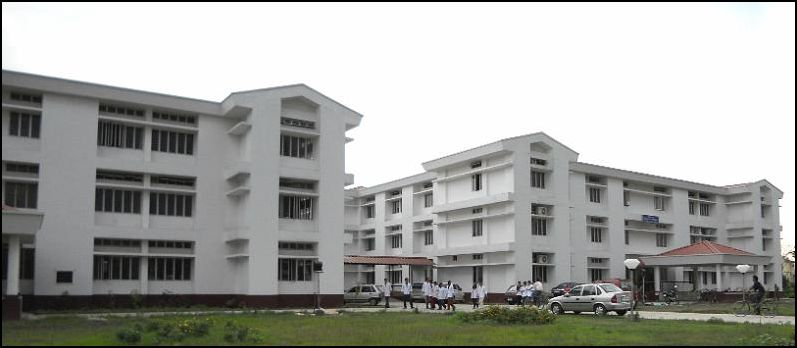
An academic building

=== Accommodation ===
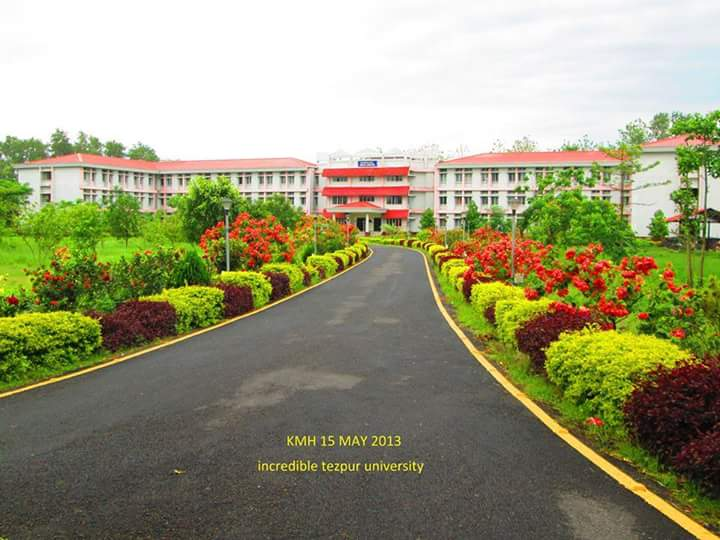
Kanchenjunga Men's Hostel, Tezpur University

There are provisions for visitors to stay in the university guest house. Students may choose to stay in any of the men's or women's hostels. The university is primarily a residential university.

The university has eight men's hostels (listed in order of construction):

- Brahmaputra Boys’ Hostel: (formerly Brahmaputra Chatra Niwas) is a boys’ residential hostel named after the mighty Brahmaputra River. The facility is currently inoperational.
- Charaideo Men's Hostel: Named after the burial land of Ahom kings in Sivasagar, Assam.
- Nilachal Men's Hostel: Named after the Nilachal Hill in Guwahati
- Kanchenjungha Men's Hostel: Named after Kangchenjunga, the third highest mountain in the world (after Mount Everest and K2).
- Patkai Men's Hostel: Named after the Patkai-Bum, the Khasi-Jaintia-Garo, and the Lushai hills mountain range in the eastern Himalayas.
- Saraighat C. V. Raman Men's Hostel: Named after the Saraighat Bridge at Guwahati and the famous Indian physicist and Nobel laureate Sir C. V. Raman.
- Transit Men's Hostel I
- Transit Men's Hostel II
- Lachit Borphukan Boys' Hostel: Named after the legendary Ahom general Lachit Borphukan, who achieved a decisive victory against the Mughal forces at the Battle of Saraighat (1671).

There are nine women's hostels:

- Bordoichilla Women's hostel: Named after the seasonal storm that occurs in Assam every spring, before and after the festival of Bihu.
- Dhansiri Women's hostel: Named after the river Dhansiri
- Pragjyotika Women's Hostel: Named after Pragjyotishpur, the name of the capital city of historical Kamrup kingdom.
- Subansiri Women’s Hostel: Named after the river Subansiri
- Kopili Women's Hostel: Named after the river Kopili
- Pobitora Madam Curie Women's Hostel: Named after the Pobitara Wildlife Sanctuary and the physicist Marie Curie.
- Jiri Women's Hostel: Named after the river Jiri
- Transit Women's Hostel
- Kanaklata Barua Girls' Hostel: Named after the Assamese freedom fighter Kanaklata Baruah

There is also a married-scholars hostel, which is presently serving as a makeshift accommodation for newly recruited faculty of the university.

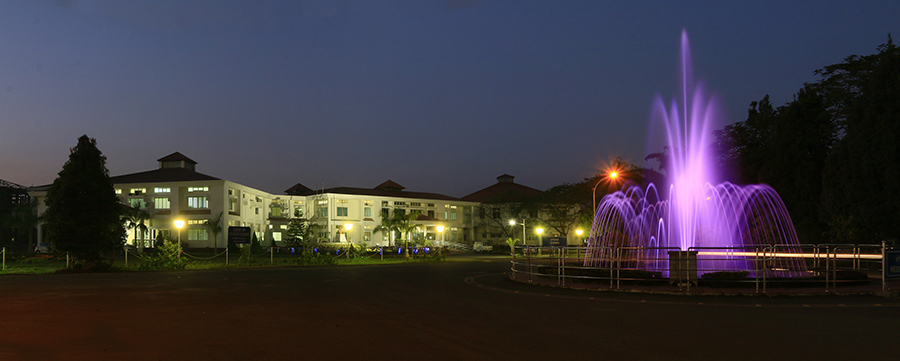

=== Communications ===
E-Rickshaw, the chief mode of public transport in and around Tezpur, runs between Tezpur University and Tezpur city. There is an ASTC bus utility between the university and the ASTC bus stand located at the heart of Tezpur city near the State Bank of India (Main Branch). ASTC and private buses run daily between Tezpur and some other major places like Guwahati (ISBT, Lokhra), Bongaigaon, North Lakhimpur, Dibrugarh, Tinsukia, etc. 20-seater cabs ply between Tezpur and Paltan Bazaar, Guwahati. Dekargaon Railway Station offers a link between Tezpur and to other parts of Assam. Travelers can also opt for flying to and from Tezpur where the nearest airport - Tezpur Airport provides air link with Guwahati Kolkata and Silchar. For other destinations, the nearest airport is the Lokapriya Gopinath Bordoloi International Airport at Guwahati.

== Organisation and administration ==
=== Schools and departments ===
The university has five schools of studies which are divided into 27 departments and additional centers and cells.

- School of Sciences
- School of Humanities & Social Sciences
- School of Management Sciences
- School of Engineering
- School for Multidisciplinary Studies

The School of Sciences is divided into six departments, which provides undergraduate and postgraduate degrees in Science and carry on research in science and mathematics.

- Department of Chemical Sciences
- Department of Environmental Science
- Department of Mathematical Sciences
- Department of Molecular Biology and Biotechnology
- Department of Physics

The School of Humanities & Social Sciences provides education as well as diploma, undergraduate, postgraduate, and research programs related to humanities and social sciences in the following departments:

- Department of Assamese
- Department of Cultural Studies
- Department of Education
- Department of English
- Department of Foreign Languages
- Department of Hindi
- Department of Law
- Department of Linguistics and Language Technology
- Department of Mass Communication and Journalism
- Department of Social Work
- Department of Sociology

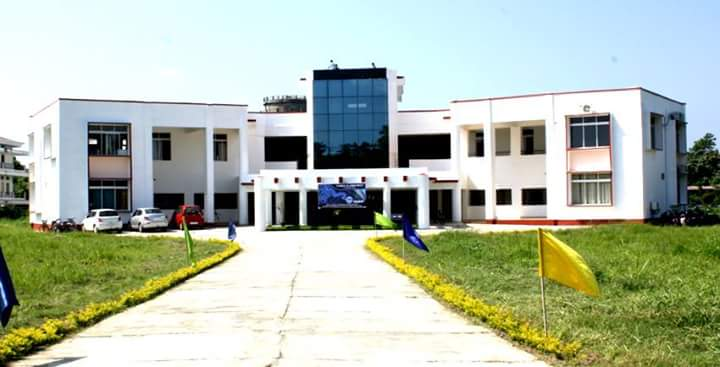
Department of Business Administration, Tezpur University

The School of Management Sciences provides education as well as diploma, undergraduate, postgraduate, and research programs related to business management in the following departments:

- Department of Business Administration
- Department of Commerce
- Centre for Disaster Management

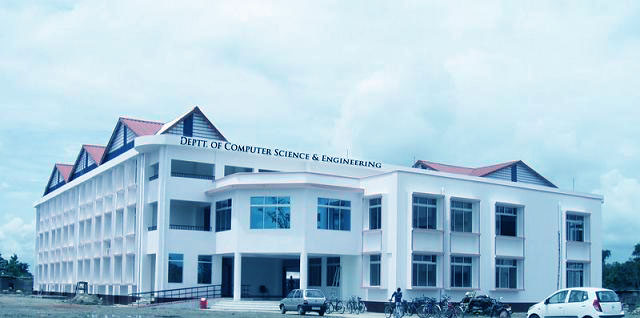
Department of Computer Science and Engineering

The School of Engineering offers courses in engineering and technology. The offering masters and BTech programs in the various disciplines. Admission to the BTech programs is on the basis of JEE (Main). Besides BTech and MTech programs, School of Engineering, the university provides PhD programs in specialised fields.

- Department of Applied Sciences
- Department of Civil Engineering
- Department of Computer Science & Engineering
- Department of Design
- Department of Energy
- Department of Electrical Engineering
- Department of Electronics and Communication Engineering
- Department of Food Engineering and Technology
- Department of Mechanical Engineering
- Department of Vocational Studies and Skill Development

=== Special centres and cells ===
Centres

- Centre for Endangered Languages (CFEL)
- Centre for Inclusive Development (CID)
- Centre for Innovation Incubation and Entrepreneurship(CIIE)
- Centre for Multidisciplinary Research (CMR)
- Teaching and Learning Centre (TLC)
- Technology Enabling Centre (TEC)
- Centre for Women Studies (CWS)

Cells

- Research & Development (R & D) Cell
- Intellectual Property Rights (IPR) Cell
- DBT Nodal Centre
- ONGC Centre for Petroleum Biotechnology (CPBT)
- Bioinformatics Infrastructure Facility (BIF)
- Institutional Biotech Hub
- Internal Quality Assurance Cell (IQAC)

== Academic Profile ==
=== Rankings ===
University rankings

General – international
- QS (Asia) (2024): 501-550
- Times (World) (2024): 1201-1500
- Times (Asia) (2024): 401-500

General – India
- NIRF (Overall) (2024): 101-150
- NIRF (Universities) (2024): 69

Engineering – India
- NIRF (2024): 151-200

Business/Management – India
- NIRF (2024): 95

Tezpur University was ranked 801–1000 in the world by the Times Higher Education World University Rankings of 2020 and 251–300 in Asia. The QS World University Rankings ranked it 281–290 in Asia in 2022. In India it was ranked 69th among universities and 95th in Management by the National Institutional Ranking Framework (NIRF) of 2024.

== Student life ==
=== Major annual events ===
==== National Science Day-inSCIgnis ====
The science festival of the university organised by the School of Sciences and Students' Science Council (SSC) is a two-day event with competitions for school and undergraduate students. It is one of the biggest science festivals of the entire northeast. The main feature of this festival is the lecture, where the doyen of Indian science and mathematics are invited as speakers. Also, many other events including NERLSE (North East Regional Level Science Exhibition) both for UG and PG level, Thalamus the school quiz, Cerebrum the open science quiz, Theatrix the Sci-fi movie screening and other numerous departmental events are organised during the festival. Students from all over the region participate in it.

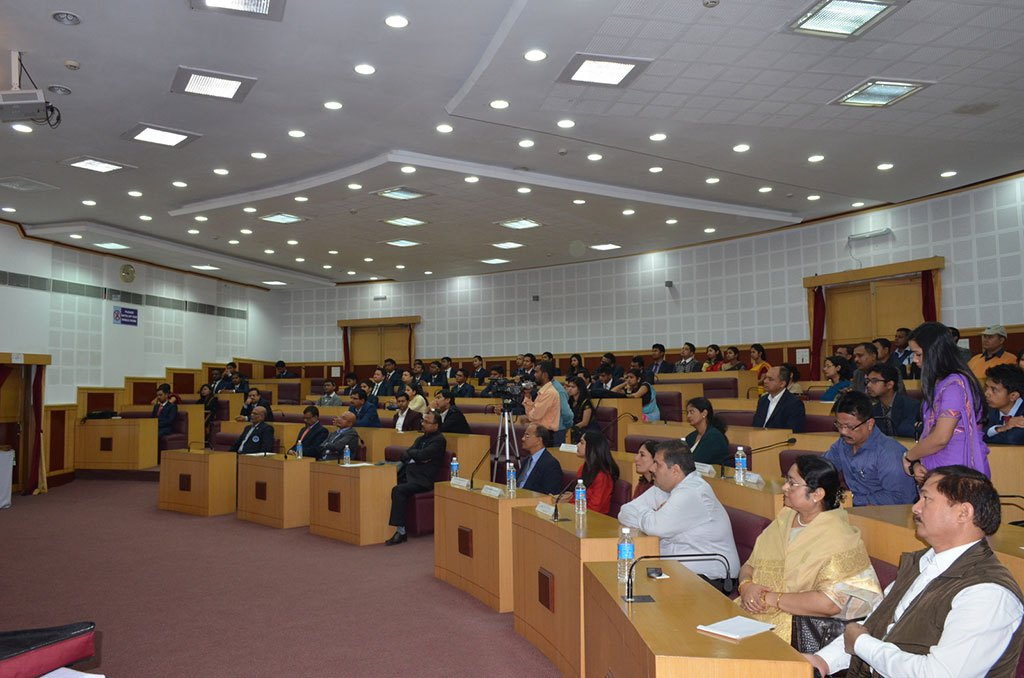
Sampark 2015

==== Sampark-The Interface ====
"SAMPARK... the interface" is the annual national-level B-school event of the Department of Business Administration, organised mainly by the students with active support from the faculty members.

==== TechXetra ====
TechXetra is the National Level Annual Technical Festival of the university. TechXetra is a combination of two words- Tech and Xetra. "Tech" refers to the technology and 'Xetra' meaning terrain. It is one of the common platforms in North-East India to showcase knowledge and intellect. A blend of technical and management events, it has cultural events as well. Competitions in the field of robotics, coding, tech quiz, etc. are held which vary from year to year. TechXetra attracts enthusiasts from all over India.
