= Fields Medal Symposium =

Mathematics award

The Fields Medal Symposium is an annual event that honours one of the Fields Medal recipients from the most recent International Congress of Mathematicians. The symposium is jointly endorsed by the International Mathematical Union and the Fields Institute for Mathematical Sciences. The idea was conceived in preparation for the International Congress of Mathematicians 2010 (ICM2010) in Hyberdad, India. Professor Edward Bierstone of the University of Toronto was the director of the institute during the inaugural symposium in October 2012. All symposiums take place at the Fields Institute in Toronto, Canada. The symposia include mathematical activity that explore work related to the honoured Fields Medallist. They will include public lectures meant to spark interest in mathematics including public lectures and events for students.

== List of Symposium Honorees ==
| Year of Symposium | Organizers | Fields Medalist | Symposium Speakers | Medallists' Distinguished Work |
|---|---|---|---|---|
| 2012 (Inaugural) | James Arthur (chair); Edward Frenkel; Gérard Laumon | Ngô Bảo Châu | Ngô Bảo Châu; Pierre-Henri Chaudouard; Edward Frenkel; Michael Harris; Tamas Hausel; Nigel Hitchin; Mark Kisin; Laurent Lafforgue; Sophie Morel; David Nadler; Peter Scholze; Diana Shelstad; Richard Taylor; Jean-Loup Waldspurger; Edward Witten | Relation of Hitchin fibrations to the Arthur–Selberg trace formula: Proof of the Fundamental Lemma for Lie algebras |
| 2013 | Peter Sarnak (Chair) Alex Eskin Dimitry Jakobson Marina Ratner Ralf Spatzier | Elon Lindenstrauss | Nalini Anantharaman Yves Benoist Jean Bourgain Shimon Brooks Manfred Einsiedler Alex Eskin Hillel Furstenberg Anatole Katok Elon Lindenstrauss Gregory Margulis Shahar Mozes Hee Oh Kannan Soundararajan Masaki Tsukamaoto Benjamin Weiss Tamar Ziegler | 2010 Fields Medal for his results on measure rigidity in ergodic theory, and their applications to number theory |
| 2014 | Alessio Figalli Robert McCann Clement Mouhot Neil Trudinger | Cédric Villani | Roger-Dominique Bakry Luis Caffarelli Eric Carlen Jeff Cheeger Wilfrid Gangbo Yan Guo Michel Ledoux Monika Ludwig Nader Masmoudi Assaf Naor Felix Otto Tristan Rivière Laure Saint-Raymond Karl-Theodor Sturm Vladimir Sverak Horng-Tzer Yau | 2010 Fields Medal for his proofs of nonlinear Landau damping and convergence to equilibrium for the Boltzmann equation. |
| 2015 | Ilia Binder John Cardy Kostya Khanin Greg Lawler Gordon Slade Balint Virag Wendelin Werner | Stanislav Smirnov | Michael Aizenman Dmitri Belyaev Alexei Borodin John Cardy Dmitry Chelkak Geoffrey Grimmett Jacek Graczyk Clément Hongler Rick Kenyon Antti Kupiainen Greg Lawler Bernard Nienhuis Dimitry Panchenko Steffen Rohde Scott Sheffield Béatrice de Tilière Anna Zdunik | 2010 Fields Medal for the proof of conformal invariance of percolation and the planar Ising model in statistical physics. |
| 2016 | Ingrid Daubechies John Friedlander Florian Herzig Kumar Murty Sujatha Ramdorai Jacob Tsimerman | Manjul Bhargava | Eknath Ghate Benedict Gross Piper Harron Wei Ho Melanie Wood Barry Mazur Alison Miller Hee Oh Peter Sarnak Arul Shankar Christopher Skinner Jacob Tsimerman Ila Varma Xiaoheng Wang | 2014 Fields Medal for developing powerful new methods in the geometry of numbers, which he applied to count rings of small rank and to bound the average rank of elliptic curves |
| 2017 | Jean-Pierre Eckmann; Massimiliano Gubinelli; Dmitry Panchenko; Jeremy Quastel; Gigliola Staffilani | Martin Hairer | Gordon Slade; Laure Saint-Raymond; Hugo Duminil-Copin; Horng-Tzer Yau; Sylvia Serfaty; Lorenzo Zambotti; Konstantin Matetski; Jean-Christophe Mourrat; Hendrik Weber; Ajay Chandra; Massimiliano Gubinelli; Alexei Borodin; Jonathan Mattingly; Arnaud Debussche; Gérard Ben Arous | 2014 Fields Medal for outstanding contributions to the theory of stochastic partial differential equations, and in particular for the creation of a theory of regularity structures for such equations. |
| 2018 | Fanny Kassel Amir Mohammadi Yulan Qing Kasra Rafi | Maryam Mirzakhani | Alex Wright Anna Wienhard Peter Sarnak Simion Filip Howard Masur Hee Oh Scott Wolpert Kathryn Mann Francis Bonahon Juan Souto Alex Eskin Steve Kerckhoff Anton Zorich Ursula Hamenstädt Elon Lindenstrauss Yair Minsky Amie Wilkinson (Public Opening Lecturer) | 2014 Fields Medal for her outstanding contributions to the dynamics and geometry of Riemann surfaces and their moduli spaces. |
| 2019 | Giovanni Forni Svetlana Jitomirskaya Konstantin Khanin Raphaël Krikorian Misha Lyubich Michael Yampolsky | Artur Avila | Misha Lyubich Raphaël Krikorian Amie Wilkinson Giovanni Forni Giulio Tiozzo Daniel Smania Zhiyuan Zhang Svetlana Jitomirskaya Dmitry Dolgopyat Sylvain Crovisier Alex Eskin Ursula Hamenstädt Xavier Buff David Damanik | 2014 Fields Medal for his profound contributions to dynamical systems theory, which have changed the face of the field, using the powerful idea of renormalization as a unifying principle. |
| 2020 | Almut Burchard Luis Caffarelli Jacopo De Simoi Francesco Maggi Robert McCann | Alessio Figalli | Luigi Ambrosio Matteo Bonforte Yann Brenier Xavier Cabré Maria Colombo Guido De Philippis Wilfrid Gangbo Alice Guionnet Young-Heon Kim Connor Mooney Xavier Ros-Oton Sylvia Serfaty Joaquim Serra Enrico Valdinoci | |
| 2021 | Bhargav Bhatt Ana Caraiani Matthew Satriano Ila Varma | Peter Scholze | | |
