= Juan Luis Vázquez Suárez =

Professor of Applied Mathematics

Juan Luis Vázquez Suárez is a professor of Applied Mathematics at Universidad Autónoma de Madrid (UAM), Spain.

== Education ==
He was born in Oviedo on July 26, 1946. In the years 1964/69 he studied Telecommunication Engineering at the Superior Technical School of Ingenieros de Telecomunicación (ETSIT) in Madrid. In 1973 he graduated in Mathematics at the Universidad Complutense de Madrid, where he also obtained the Ph. D. degree in 1979 with a thesis directed by Haïm Brezis and Jesús Ildefonso Díaz.

== Contributions ==
His research covers areas of mathematics such as nonlinear partial differential equations and their applications to physics and engineering. He published in scientific journals like Archive for Rational Mechanics and Analysis, Communications on Pure and Applied Mathematics, Journal de mathématiques pures et appliquées, Advances in Mathematics among others. He was president of Spanish Society for Applied Mathematics in the period 1996/98. Organizer of international events like the International Conference on Free Boundaries FB1993 (Toledo, Spain) or the Summer Schools at the Universidad Internacional Menéndez Pelayo, UIMP.

== Awards and honors ==
He obtained the Spanish National Prize of Research in Mathematics in 2003, and that year he was included in the Thomson Reuters list of Highly Cited Scientists.

He was invited as main speaker at the International Congress of Mathematicians held in Madrid in 2006 (ICM2006) with the plenary conference entitled "Nonlinear diffusion, from analysis to physics and geometry."

In 2012 he became a fellow of the American Mathematical Society.

== Journal articles ==
- Bonforte, M.; Dolbeault, J.; Grillo, G.; Vázquez, J. L. (September 7, 2010). "Sharp rates of decay of solutions to the nonlinear fast diffusion equation via functional inequalities". Proceedings of the National Academy of Sciences of the United States of America. 107 (38): 16459–16464. doi:10.1073/pnas.1003972107. PMC 2944723. Zbl 1256.35026.
- Caffarelli, Luis; Vazquez, Juan Luis (2011). "Nonlinear Porous Medium Flow with Fractional Potential Pressure". Archive for Rational Mechanics and Analysis. 202: 537–565. arXiv:1001.0410. doi:10.1007/s00205-011-0420-4.
- de Pablo, Arturo; Quirós, Fernando; Rodríguez, Ana; Vázquez, Juan Luis (2011). "A fractional porous medium equation". Advances in Mathematics. 226 (2): 1378–1409. doi:10.1016/j.aim.2010.07.017. Zbl 1208.26016.
- de Pablo, Arturo; Quirós, Fernando; Rodríguez, Ana; Vázquez, Juan Luis (2012). "A general fractional porous medium equation". Communications on Pure and Applied Mathematics. 65 (9): 1242–1284. doi:10.1002/cpa.21408. Zbl 1248.35220.
- Bonforte, Matteo; Grillo, Gabriele; Vázquez, Juan Luis (2012). "Behaviour near extinction for the fast diffusion equation on bounded domains". Journal de Mathématiques Pures et Appliquées. 97 (1): 1–38. doi:10.1016/j.matpur.2011.03.002. Zbl 1241.35013.
- Caffarelli, Luis; Soria, Fernando; Vázquez, Juan Luis. "Regularity of solutions of the fractional porous medium flow". Journal of the European Mathematical Society. 15 (5): 1701–1746. doi:10.4171/JEMS/401.

== Books ==
- The Porous Medium Equation. Mathematical Theory. Oxford University Press, ISBN 0-19-856903-3, ISBN 978-0-19-856903-9, 2006, Clarendon Press, 648 pages, 234x156 mm. Series: Oxford Mathematical Monographs.
- Smoothing and Decay Estimates for Nonlinear Diffusion Equations. Equations of Porous Medium Type. Oxford University Press, ISBN 0-19-920297-4, ISBN 978-0-19-920297-3, August 2006, 248 pages, 234x156 mm, Oxford Lecture Series.
- A Stability Technique for Evolution Partial Differential Equations. A Dynamical Systems Approach. PNLDE 56 (Progress in Non-Linear Differential Equations and Their Applications), Birkhäuser Verlag, 2003, 391 pages. (with V.A. Galaktionov.)
- Recent Trends in Partial Differential Equations. American Mathematical Society, ISBN 0-8218-3891-1 ISBN 978-0-8218-3891-4, 2006, 123 pages, Series: Contemporary Mathematics number 409; (with X. Cabré and José A. Carrillo)
