= Jean-Michel Coron =

French mathematician

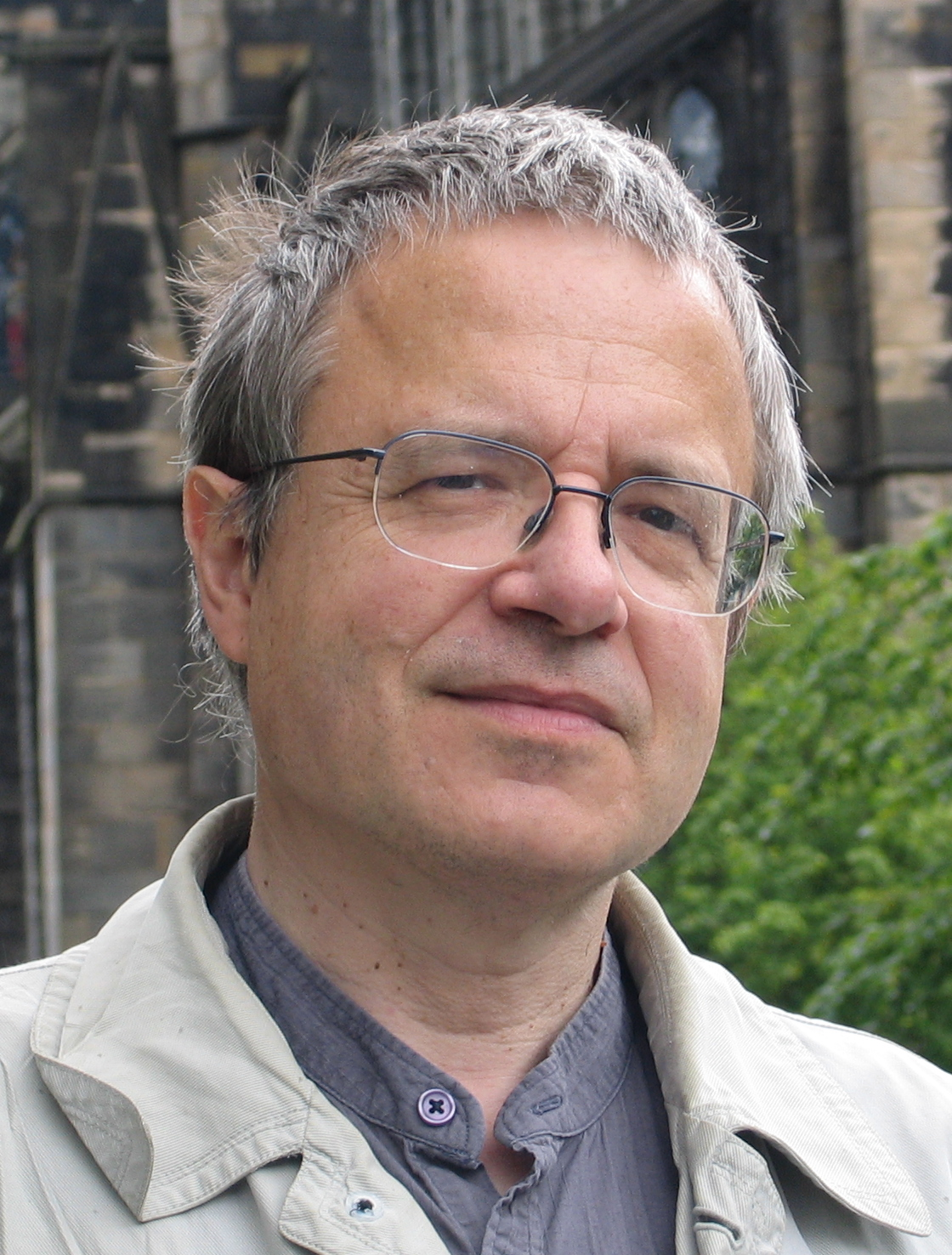
- Jean-Michel Coron in 2009
- Born: August 8, 1956 (age 70); Paris
- Education: Pierre and Marie Curie University
- Awards: Fermat Prize (1993)
- Scientific career
- Fields: Mathematics
- Workplaces: Paris-Sud 11 University
- Doctoral advisor: Haïm Brezis
- Doctoral students: Karine Beauchard; Fabrice Bethuel; Frédéric Hélein

Jean-Michel Coron (born August 8, 1956) is a French mathematician. He first studied at École Polytechnique, where he worked on his PhD thesis advised by Haïm Brezis. Since 1992, he has studied the control theory of partial differential equations, and which includes both control and stabilization. His results concern partial differential equations related to fluid dynamics, with emphasis on nonlinear phenomena, and part of them found applications to control channels.

He had previously worked in the field of non-linear functional analysis, where he also obtained significant results. Jean-Michel Coron was awarded numerous prizes, such as the Fermat prize in 1993, the Peccot lecture in 1987, the Jaffé prize in 1995 by the Académie des Sciences, and the Dargelos prize in 2002.

He was invited at the 1990 International Congress of Mathematicians (Kyoto) in the section Partial Differential Equations, and he was also invited as a plenary speaker at the 2010 International Congress of Mathematicians, Hyderabad, India. He is an emeritus Professor at Sorbonne University in Paris, and was a Senior member of the Institut Universitaire de France between 2003 and 2013. He is also a member of the Académie des Sciences and the Academia Europaea.

Jean-Michel Coron is the husband of Claire Voisin who was also plenary speaker at the 2010 International Congress of Mathematicians and who is the 2016 recipient of the Gold medal of the French National Centre for Scientific Research, the highest scientific research award in France. They have five children.

== Notable publications ==
- Haïm Brezis and Jean-Michel Coron. Multiple solutions of H-systems and Rellich's conjecture. Comm. Pure Appl. Math. 37 (1984), no. 2, 149–187.
- Jean-Michel Coron. Topologie et cas limite des injections de Sobolev. C. R. Acad. Sci. Paris Sér. I Math. 299 (1984), no. 7, 209–212.
- H. Brezis and J.-M. Coron. Convergence of solutions of H-systems or how to blow bubbles. Arch. Rational Mech. Anal. 89 (1985), no. 1, 21–56.
- Haïm Brezis, Jean-Michel Coron, and Elliott H. Lieb. Harmonic maps with defects. Comm. Math. Phys. 107 (1986), no. 4, 649–705. doi:10.1007/BF01205490
- A. Bahri and J.-M. Coron. On a nonlinear elliptic equation involving the critical Sobolev exponent: the effect of the topology of the domain. Comm. Pure Appl. Math. 41 (1988), no. 3, 253–294.
- Bahri, A.; Coron, J.-M. (1991). "The scalar-curvature problem on the standard three-dimensional sphere". Journal of Functional Analysis. 95 (1): 106–172. doi:10.1016/0022-1236(91)90026-2. MR 1087949.
- Jean-Michel Coron. Global asymptotic stabilization for controllable systems without drift. Math. Control Signals Systems 5 (1992), no. 3, 295–312. doi:10.1007/BF01211563
- Jean-Michel Coron, Brigitte d'Andréa-Novel, and Georges Bastin. A strict Lyapunov function for boundary control of hyperbolic systems of conservation laws. IEEE Trans. Autom. Control 52 (2007), no. 1, 2–11. doi:10.1109/TAC.2006.887903
