= Fabrice Bethuel =

French mathematician

- Born: 7 June 1963 (age 62)
- Awards: Fermat Prize (1999)
- Scientific career
- Fields: Mathematics
- Institutions: Paris VI University
- Doctoral advisor: Jean-Michel Coron
- Doctoral students: Tristan Rivière; Sylvia Serfaty

Fabrice Bethuel (born 7 June 1963) is a French mathematician. He holds a chair at Paris VI University.

Bethuel earned his doctorate at Paris-Sud 11 University in 1989, under supervision of Jean-Michel Coron. In 1998 Bethuel was an Invited Speaker of the International Congress of Mathematicians in Berlin. He won the 1999 Fermat Prize, jointly with Frédéric Hélein, for several important contributions to the theory of variational calculus. He also won the 2003 Mergier–Bourdeix Prize for his fundamental discoveries at the interface between analysis, topology, geometry, and physics.

== Notable publications ==
Research articles

- Fabrice Bethuel and Xiao Min Zheng. Density of smooth functions between two manifolds in Sobolev spaces. J. Funct. Anal. 80 (1988), no. 1, 60–75.
- Fabrice Bethuel. The approximation problem for Sobolev maps between two manifolds. Acta Math. 167 (1991), no. 3-4, 153–206.
- Fabrice Bethuel. On the singular set of stationary harmonic maps. Manuscripta Math. 78 (1993), no. 4, 417–443.
- Fabrice Bethuel, Haïm Brezis, and Frédéric Hélein. Asymptotics for the minimization of a Ginzburg-Landau functional. Calc. Var. Partial Differential Equations 1 (1993), no. 2, 123–148.

Books

- Fabrice Bethuel, Haïm Brezis, and Frédéric Hélein. Ginzburg-Landau vortices. Reprint of the 1994 edition. Modern Birkhäuser Classics. Birkhäuser/Springer, Cham, 2017. xxix+158 pp. ISBN 978-3-319-66672-3, 978-3-319-66673-0
