= Ovidiu Savin =

Romanian-American mathematician (born 1977)

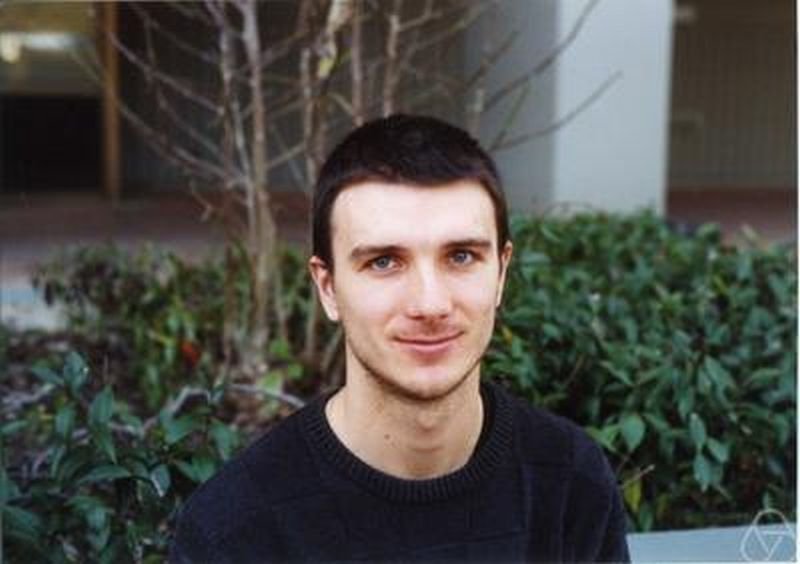
- Savin in 2003
- Born: 1 January 1977 (age 49)
- Education: University of Texas at Austin
- Awards: Stampacchia Medal (2012)
- Scientific career
- Fields: Mathematics
- Workplaces: Columbia University
- Doctoral advisor: Luis Caffarelli

Ovidiu Vasile Savin (born January 1, 1977) is a Romanian-American mathematician who is active in the field of the partial differential equations.

== Scientific activity ==
Savin received his Ph.D. in mathematics from the University of Texas at Austin in 2003 having Luis Caffarelli as advisor; he is professor of mathematics at Columbia University. Savin is mostly known for his important work on Ennio De Giorgi's conjecture about global solutions to certain semilinear equations, that he proved up to dimension 8. It is to be noticed that the conjecture turns out to be false in higher dimensions, as eventually proved by Manuel del Pino, Michał Kowalczyk, and Juncheng Wei. Savin has also worked on various regularity questions proving the gradient continuity of solutions to the infinity-Laplacian equation in two dimensions and obtaining results on the boundary regularity of solutions to the Monge–Ampère equation.

== Recognition ==
Savin won a gold medal with a perfect score in the 1995 International Mathematical Olympiad. As an undergraduate at the University of Pittsburgh in 1997, Savin was a William Lowell Putnam Mathematical Competition fellow. Savin was an invited speaker at the International Congress of Mathematicians in 2006. He was awarded the Stampacchia Medal in 2012.
