= Institute for Mathematical Research =

Swiss research institute

Coordinates: 47.3863169°N 8.5287591°E

The Institute for Mathematical Research (Forschungsinstitut für Mathematik, FIM) is a mathematical research institution located at ETH Zurich and founded in 1964 by Beno Eckmann. Its main goals are to promote and facilitate the exchange between ETH Zurich and international leading mathematicians.

The Institute offers a platform on which contacts between faculty members of the Department of Mathematics of ETH, graduate students, members of the Swiss mathematical community at large and international researchers can be established. A staff structure of a director, a coordinator and an administrative assistant, an infrastructure of 30 working spaces, and an independent budget serve as the basis of the Institute.

This structure enables the FIM to host about 200 guests per year, ranging from short term visits of one or two days to long term stays of up to one year. Furthermore, the FIM organises scientific activities like conferences, minicourses and advanced graduate courses.

FIM is member of EPDI (European Post-Doctoral Institute for Mathematical Sciences) and ERCOM (European Research Centres on Mathematics) and is jointly financed by the SNF and ETH Zurich.

== List of directors ==
- 2019–present Alessio Figalli
- 2009–2019 Tristan Rivière
- 1999–2009 Marc Burger
- 1995–1999 Alain-Sol Sznitman
- 1984–1995 Jürgen Moser
- 1964–1984 Beno Eckmann

== Advisory board ==
Internal Advisory Board: Rahul Pandharipande, Alain-Sol Sznitman, Rico Zenklusen

External Advisory Board: Viviane Baladi, Martin Hairer, Akshay Venkatesh, Cédric Villani

== Guests ==
FIM maintains an online list of the present and scheduled guests at the institute.
