= Regularity theorem =

In mathematics, regularity theorem may refer to:

- Almgren regularity theorem
- Elliptic regularity
- Harish-Chandra's regularity theorem
- Regularity theorem for Lebesgue measure
