= Frédéric Hélein =

French mathematician (born 1963)

- Born: 22 April 1963 (age 63)
- Awards: Fermat Prize (1999)
- Scientific career
- Fields: Mathematics
- Institutions: Paris Diderot University
- Doctoral advisor: Jean-Michel Coron

Frédéric Hélein (born 22 April 1963) is a French mathematician. He is university professor at Paris Diderot University.

Hélein earned his doctorate at École polytechnique under supervision of Jean-Michel Coron. In 1998 Hélein was an Invited Speaker of the International Congress of Mathematicians in Berlin. He won the 1999 Fermat Prize, jointly with Fabrice Bethuel, for several important contributions to the theory of variational calculus.

== Notable publications ==
Research articles

- Frédéric Hélein. Régularité des applications faiblement harmoniques entre une surface et une variété riemannienne. C. R. Acad. Sci. Paris Sér. I Math. 312 (1991), no. 8, 591–596.
- Fabrice Bethuel, Haïm Brezis, and Frédéric Hélein. Asymptotics for the minimization of a Ginzburg-Landau functional. Calc. Var. Partial Differential Equations 1 (1993), no. 2, 123–148.

Books

- Fabrice Bethuel, Haïm Brezis, and Frédéric Hélein. Ginzburg-Landau vortices. Progress in Nonlinear Differential Equations and their Applications, 13. Birkhäuser Boston, Inc., Boston, MA, 1994. xxviii+159 pp. ISBN 0-8176-3723-0
- Frédéric Hélein. Constant mean curvature surfaces, harmonic maps and integrable systems. Notes taken by Roger Moser. Lectures in Mathematics ETH Zürich. Birkhäuser Verlag, Basel, 2001. 122 pp. ISBN 3-7643-6576-5
- Frédéric Hélein. Harmonic maps, conservation laws and moving frames. Translated from the 1996 French original. With a foreword by James Eells. Second edition. Cambridge Tracts in Mathematics, 150. Cambridge University Press, Cambridge, 2002. xxvi+264 pp. ISBN 0-521-81160-0
