= Anna Zdunik =

Polish mathematician

Anna Maria Zdunik is a Polish mathematician. She specializes in dynamical systems, and is a professor at the University of Warsaw.

== Education ==
Zdunik earned her habilitation in 2002, on the basis of an evaluation of her achievements and her dissertation.

== Career ==
She became a professor of mathematics in 2010.

She was invited as a speaker for the 2015 Fields Medal Symposium.

She is the Chair of the Faculty of Mathematics, Informatics and Mechanics of the University of Warsaw (MIMUW). The Warsaw Center of Mathematics and Computer Science (Warszawskie Centrum Nauk Matematycznych) is a project of both MIMUW and the Institute of Mathematics of the Polish Academy of Sciences (IMPAN); the center is run by an executive committee that includes Zdunik.

== Selected publications ==
- Zdunik, Anna (1991). "Harmonic Measure Versus Hausdorff Measures on Repellers for Holomorphic Maps". Transactions of the American Mathematical Society. 326 (2): 633–652. doi:10.2307/2001777. JSTOR 2001777. 1991
- Urbański, Mariusz; Zdunik, Anna (2004). "Real analyticity of Hausdorff dimension of finer Julia sets of exponential family". Ergodic Theory and Dynamical Systems. 24: 279–315. doi:10.1017/S0143385703000208. S2CID 16045557. 2004
- Davie, Alexander M.; Urbański, Mariusz; Zdunik, Anna (2007). "Maximizing Measures on Metrizable Non-Compact Spaces". Proceedings of the Edinburgh Mathematical Society. 50: 123–151. doi:10.1017/S0013091505000179. S2CID 122852202. 2007
- Barański, Krzysztof; Karpińska, Bogusława; Zdunik, Anna (2012). "Bowen's formula for meromorphic functions". Ergodic Theory and Dynamical Systems. 32 (4): 1165–1189. arXiv:1007.3855. doi:10.1017/S0143385711000290. S2CID 119134381. 2012
- Urbański, Mariusz; Zdunik, Anna (2016). "Regularity of Hausdorff measure function for conformal dynamical systems". Proceedings of the Cambridge Philosophical Society. 160 (3): 537–563. Bibcode:2016MPCPS.160..537U. doi:10.1017/S0305004116000049. S2CID 18940251. 2016
- Mayer, Volker; Urbański, Mariusz; Zdunik, Anna (2020). "Real analyticity for random dynamics of transcendental functions". Ergodic Theory and Dynamical Systems. 40 (2): 490–520. arXiv:1603.05415. doi:10.1017/etds.2018.42. S2CID 73624072. 2020
- Lech, Krzysztof; Zdunik, Anna (2022). "Total disconnectedness of Julia sets of random quadratic polynomials". Ergodic Theory and Dynamical Systems. 42 (5): 1764–1780. arXiv:2004.06955. doi:10.1017/etds.2020.148. S2CID 215768598. 2022
