= Xavier Ros-Oton =

Catalan mathematician (born 1988)

Xavier Ros Oton
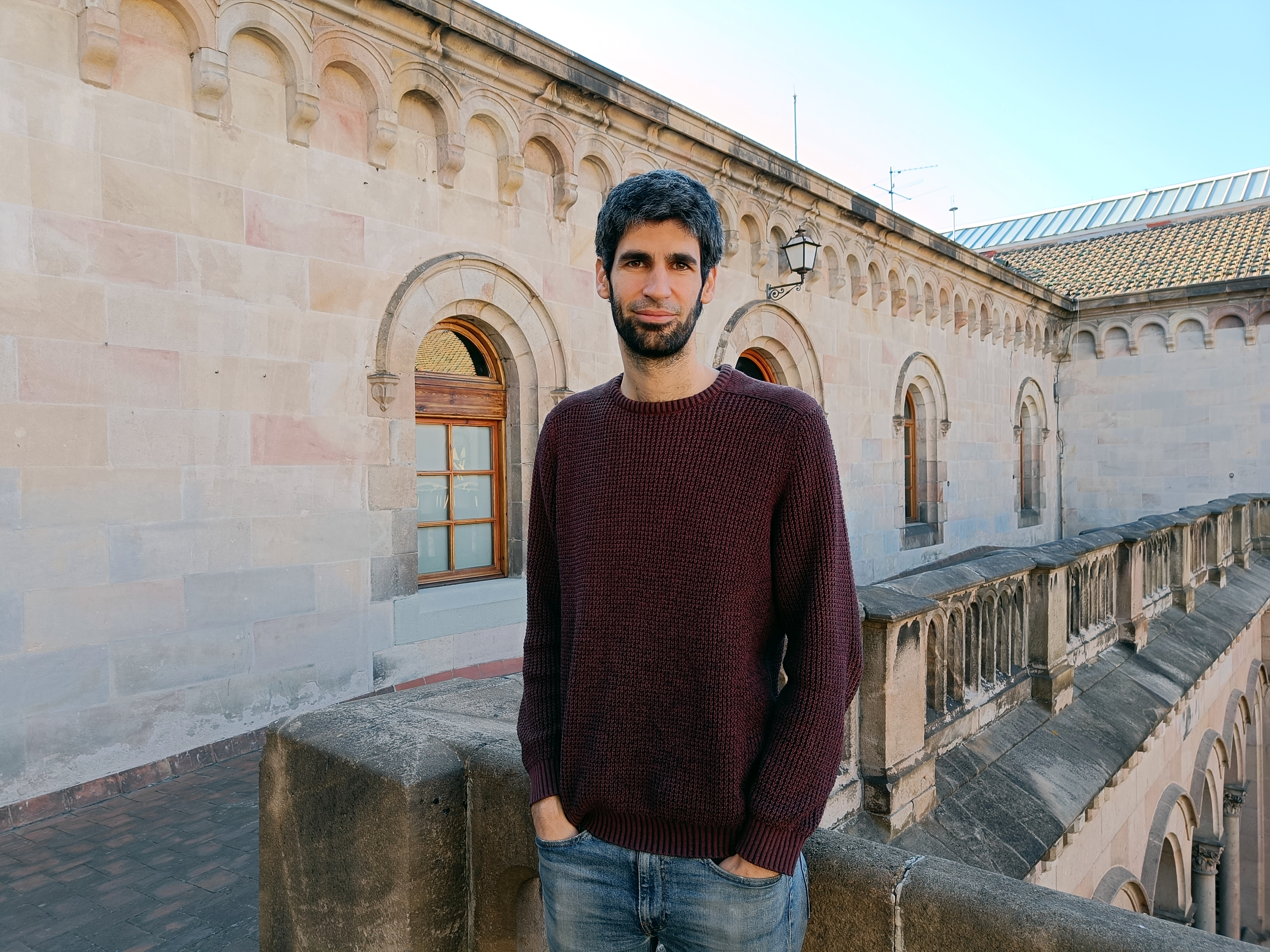
- Xavier Ros-Oton
- Born: 1988 (age 37–38); Barcelona
- Education: Universitat Politècnica de Catalunya
- Awards: Premi Nacional de Recerca al Talent Jove 2024 (2025); Premio Nacional de Investigación para Jóvenes (2023); Frontiers of Science Awards (2023); Ferran Sunyer i Balaguer Prize (2023); Stampacchia Medal (2021); Princess of Girona Scientific Research Award (2019); Rubio de Francia Prize (2017)
- Scientific career
- Fields: Mathematics; Partial Differential Equations
- Workplaces: Universitat de Barcelona; Universität Zürich; University of Texas at Austin
- Doctoral advisor: Xavier Cabré
- Other academic advisors: Alessio Figalli; Luis Caffarelli

Xavier Ros Oton (Barcelona, 1988) is a Spanish mathematician who works on partial differential equations (PDEs). He is an ICREA Research Professor and a Full Professor at the University of Barcelona.

== Research ==
His research is mainly focused on topics related to the regularity of solutions to nonlinear elliptic and parabolic PDE. Some of his main contributions have been in the context of free boundary problems, integro-differential equations, and the calculus of variations.

== Career ==
He earned his Bachelor's and master's degree at the Universitat Politècnica de Catalunya in 2010 and 2011, and completed his PhD in 2014 under the supervision of Xavier Cabré. He then moved to the University of Texas at Austin, where he was an R. H. Bing Instructor, and worked with Alessio Figalli and Luis Caffarelli. After that, he was an assistant professor at the University of Zurich. Since 2020, Ros-Oton is an ICREA Research Professor at the University of Barcelona.

He is a member of the editorial board of scientific journals, including Calculus of Variations and Partial Differential Equations and Collectanea Mathematica.

In October 2022 was elected Académico Correspondiente of the Spanish Royal Academy of Sciences. He is the youngest member of the academy.

== Honors and awards ==
In 2017, he received both the Rubio de Francia Prize from the Royal Spanish Mathematical Society and the Antonio Valle Prize from the Spanish Society of Applied Mathematics. In 2018, he was the youngest PI of an ERC Starting Grant. Then, in 2019, he received the Scientific Research Award from the Fundacion Princesa de Girona.

In 2021 he was awarded the Stampacchia Gold Medal in recognition of outstanding contributions to the field of Calculus of Variations.

In 2023 was awarded with the Ferran Sunyer i Balaguer Prize for the book "Integro-Differential Elliptic Equations", with X. Fernandez-Real.

In 2023 the government of China at the International Congress of Basic Science give to him the Frontiers of Science Awards, international prize given to 86 papers in all areas of Mathematics published in 2018–2022. Awarded twice for the articles "Generic regularity of free boundaries for the obstacle problem" and "Stable solutions to semilinear elliptic equations are smooth up to dimension 9".

In 2023 was awarded by the Spanish Government with the "Premio Nacional de Investigación para Jóvenes 2023 en Matemáticas y Tecnologías de la Información y las Comunicaciones".

He has been the PI of an ERC Consolidator Grant (2024-2029).

In 2025 was awarded by the Executive Council of Catalonia (Fundació Catalana per a la Recerca i la Innovació) with the "Premi Nacional de Recerca al Talent Jove 2024".

== Selected publications ==
- Figalli, A.; Ros-Oton, X.; Serra, J. (2024). The singular set in the Stefan problem. J. Amer. Math. Soc. 37, 305-389.
- Figalli, A.; Ros-Oton, X.; Serra, J. (2020). Generic regularity of free boundaries for the obstacle problem. Publ. Math. Inst. Hautes Études Sci. 132, 181–292.
- Cabré, X.; Figalli, A.; Ros-Oton, X.; Serra, J. (2020). Stable solutions to semilinear elliptic equations are smooth up to dimension 9. Acta Math. 224, 187–252.
- Caffarelli, L.; Ros-Oton, X.; Serra, J. (2017). Obstacle problems for integro-differential operators: regularity of solutions and free boundaries. Invent. Math. 208, 1155–1211.
