= Caccioppoli Prize =

Prize awarded by the Italian Mathematical Union

The Caccioppoli Prize is awarded by the Italian Mathematical Union to an Italian mathematician not exceeding the age of 38 who established a wide international reputation. The prize is entitled to the memory of the Italian mathematician Renato Caccioppoli and is awarded on the occasion of the Italian Mathematical Union conference every four years. In its early stages the prize was awarded every two years. The recipient currently receives 10,000 euros.

Further prizes of the Italian Mathematical Union are the Bartolozzi Prize, the Stampacchia Medal and the Vinti Prize.

== Prize winners ==
Source: Unione Matematica Italiana Winners and relative academic affiliations at the time of the awarding of the prize

- 1960 Ennio De Giorgi (Scuola Normale Superiore di Pisa)
- 1962 Edoardo Vesentini (University of Pisa)
- 1964 Emilio Gagliardo (University of Genova)
- 1966 Enrico Bombieri (University of Pisa)
- 1968 Mario Miranda (University of Pisa)
- 1970 Claudio Baiocchi (University of Pavia)
- 1974 Alberto Tognoli (University of Pisa)
- 1978 Enrico Giusti (University of Pisa)
- 1982 Antonio Ambrosetti (International School for Advanced Studies)
- 1986 Corrado De Concini (La Sapienza University of Rome)
- 1990 Gianni Dal Maso (International School for Advanced Studies)
- 1994 Nicola Fusco (University of Naples)
- 1998 Luigi Ambrosio (Scuola Normale Superiore di Pisa)
- 2002 Giovanni Alberti (University of Pisa)
- 2006 Andrea Malchiodi (International School for Advanced Studies)
- 2010 Giuseppe Mingione (University of Parma)
- 2014 Camillo De Lellis (University of Zürich)
- 2018 Valentino Tosatti (Northwestern University)
- 2022 Guido De Philippis (Courant Institute of Mathematical Sciences)

== See also ==
- List of mathematics awards
