= Institut de Mathématiques de Toulouse =

French research institute

Coordinates: 43.5617°N 1.4658°E

Institut de Mathématiques de Toulouse (Toulouse Mathematics Institute; IMT) is a research laboratory of the mathematics community of the Toulouse area in France. It is partially supported by the French public research agency CNRS as unit UMR 5129. In 2020 the research in IMT is organized into six main teams, with some overlap:

- Analyse,
- Dynamique et géométrie complexe,
- Équations aux dérivées partielles,
- Géométrie topologie algèbre,
- Probabilités,
- Statistiques et optimisation.

IMT is one of the largest French research centres in mathematics, and its scientific activities cover almost all domains of mathematics. It had approximately 200 permanent researchers and 100 PhD students in 2020, belonging to various institutions of the University of Toulouse and CNRS.

The main buildings of IMT are located on the Paul Sabatier University campus.

IMT is in charge of the Fermat Prize and of the publication Annales de la Faculté des Sciences de Toulouse.
