= Maria Colombo (mathematician) =

Italian mathematician (born 1989)

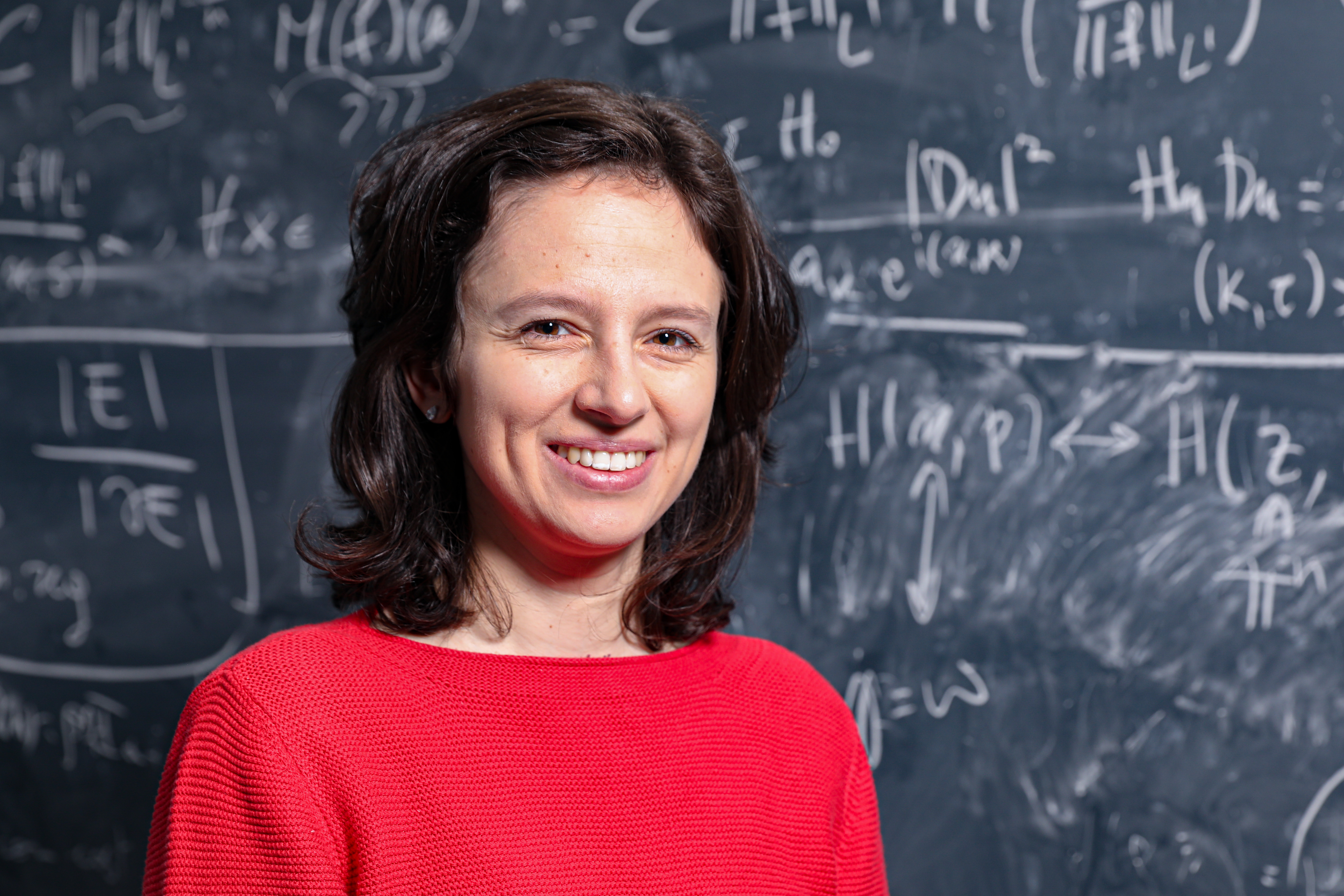
- Colombo in 2021
- Born: 25 May 1989 (age 37); Luino, Lombardy, Italy
- Awards: 2016 Gioacchino Iapichino Prize; 2017 Carlo Miranda Prize; 2019 Bartolozzi Prize; 2022 Peter Lax Award; 2023 Collatz Prize; 2024 EMS Prize; 2024 Stampacchia Medal

Academic background
- Education: Mathematics
- Alma mater: University of Pisa; Scuola Normale Superiore di Pisa
- Thesis: Flows of non-smooth vector fields and degenerate elliptic equations: With applications to the Vlasov-Poisson and semigeostrophic systems (2015)
- Doctoral advisor: Luigi Ambrosio; Alessio Figalli
- Other advisor: Camillo De Lellis

Academic work
- Discipline: Mathematics
- Institutions: EPFL (École Polytechnique Fédérale de Lausanne), ETH Zurich, University of Zurich
- Main interests: Mathematical analysis Calculus of variations Partial differential equation
- Website: www.epfl.ch/labs/amcv/

Maria Colombo (born 25 May 1989) is an Italian mathematician specializing in mathematical analysis. She is a professor at the EPFL (École Polytechnique Fédérale de Lausanne) in Switzerland, where she holds the chair for mathematical analysis, calculus of variations and partial differential equations.

== Education and career ==
Colombo was born in Luino, near the Swiss border with Italy. She competed for Italy in the 2005, 2006, and 2007 International Mathematical Olympiads, earning bronze, gold, and silver medals respectively.

She earned bachelor's and master's degrees in mathematics at the University of Pisa in 2010 and 2011, and completed a PhD in 2015 at the Scuola Normale Superiore di Pisa, under the joint supervision of Luigi Ambrosio and Alessio Figalli. Her dissertation, Flows of non-smooth vector fields and degenerate elliptic equations: With applications to the Vlasov-Poisson and semigeostrophic systems, was published as a book in 2017 by Edizioni della Normale.

She did postdoctoral research with Camillo De Lellis at the University of Zurich and was a junior fellow at the Institute of Theoretical Studies at ETH Zurich. She then joined the EPFL as an assistant professor in 2018, and was promoted to full professor in 2021.

== Recognition ==
The Accademia dei Lincei gave Colombo their Gioacchino Iapichino Prize for 2016. She was the 2017 winner of the Carlo Miranda Prize of the National Society of Sciences, Letters and Arts of Naples, and the 2019 winner of the Bartolozzi Prize of the Italian Mathematical Union. She is the 2022 winner of the biennial Peter Lax Award, to be given at the International Conference on Hyperbolic Problems, and the 2023 winner of the Collatz Prize of the International Council for Industrial and Applied Mathematics, "for her fundamental contributions to regularity theory and the analysis of singularities in elliptic partial differential equations, geometric variational problems, transport equations, and incompressible fluid dynamics". In 2024, she was awarded the EMS Prize for breakthrough results in fluid dynamics, optimal transport and kinetic theory, and for her impact on analysis more broadly. That same year, she was awarded the Stampacchia Medal.

== Personal life ==
Colombo is married to an engineer, with whom she has five children.
