= Annales de la Faculté des Sciences de Toulouse =

- Discipline: Mathematics
- Language: English, French
- Edited by: Vincent Guedj

Publication details
- History: 1887–present

Standard abbreviations
- ISO 4: Ann. Fac. Sci. Toulouse
- MathSciNet: Ann. Fac. Sci. Toulouse Math.

Indexing
- ISSN: 0240-2963

Links
- Journal homepage

The Annales de la Faculté des Sciences de Toulouse (French pronunciation: [anal də la fakylte de sjɑ̃s də tuluz]) is a peer-reviewed scientific journal covering all fields of mathematics. Articles are written in English or French. It is published by the Institut de Mathématiques de Toulouse and edited with the help of the Centre de diffusion de revues académiques mathématiques. The editor-in-chief is Vincent Guedj (Université Paul Sabatier). The journal is abstracted and indexed in Zentralblatt MATH.

== History ==
The journal was established in 1887 by Marie Henri Andoyer, Benjamin Baillaud, G. Berson, T. Chauvin, E. Cosserat, A. Destrem, C. Fabre, A. Legoux, Paul Sabatier, and Thomas Joannes Stieltjes. Originally, the journal was multidisciplinary; the present version corresponds to the original "Mathematics" section.
