= Claudio Baiocchi =

Italian mathematician (1940–2020)

- Born: 20 August 1940
- Died: 14 December 2020
- Known for: Baiocchi transform
- Awards: Caccioppoli Prize (1970)
- Scientific career
- Fields: Partial differential equations Calculus of variations Cellular automata
- Institutions: University of Pavia; Sapienza University of Rome

Claudio Baiocchi (August 20, 1940 – December 14, 2020) was an Italian mathematician. He was a professor at the University of Pavia and since the 1990s he was a professor of mathematical higher analysis at the Sapienza University.

He worked on partial differential equations and the calculus of variations. In 1971 he applied his mathematical methods to a free boundary problem in the filtration of liquids through porous media with applications in civil engineering (by using the Baiocchi transform).

His later research dealt with, among other topics, the Collatz problem, cellular automata and Turing machines.

In 1970 Baiocchi received the Caccioppoli Prize. In 1974 he was an invited speaker at the International Congress of Mathematicians in Vancouver. He was elected to the Accademia dei XL and the Accademia dei Lincei.

== Selected publications ==
- with V. Comincioli, E. Magenes & G. A. Pozzi: "Free boundary problems in the theory of fluid flow through porous media: existence and uniqueness theorems". Annali di Matematica Pura ed Applicata. 97 (1): 1–82. 1973. doi:10.1007/bf02414909. S2CID 119934268.
- "Free boundary problems in the theory of fluid flow through porous media". Proc. Intern. Congress of Math. 2. 1974.
- with Antonio Capelo: Variational and quasivariational inequalities. Applications to free boundary problems. Chichester/New York, Wiley 1984.
- with G. Buttazzo, F. Gastaldi & F. Tomarelli: Baiocchi, Claudio; Buttazzo, Giuseppe; Gastaldi, Fabio; Tomarelli, Franco (1988). "General existence theorems for unilateral problems in continuum mechanics". Archive for Rational Mechanics and Analysis. 100 (2): 149–189. doi:10.1007/bf00282202. S2CID 121906311.
- with F. Brezzi & L. D. Marini; Stabilization of Galerkin methods and applications to domain decomposition (pp. 343-355). Berlin; Heidelberg: Springer. 1992.
- as editor with Jacques-Louis Lions: Boundary value problems for partial differential equations and applications. Dedicated to Enrico Magenes, Elsevier-Masson, 1993
- with F. Brezzi & L. P. Franca: Baiocchi, Claudio; Brezzi, Franco; Franca, Leopoldo P. (1993). "Virtual bubbles and Galerkin-least-squares type methods (Ga. LS)". Computer Methods in Applied Mechanics and Engineering. 105 (1): 125–141. doi:10.1016/0045-7825(93)90119-i.
