= Gianni Dal Maso =

Italian mathematician

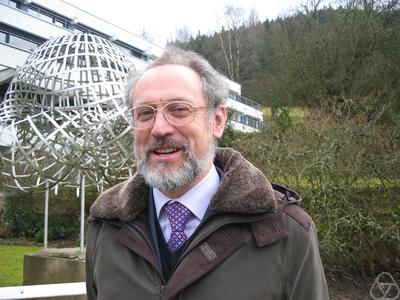
- Born: 1954 (age 71–72); Vicenza, Italy
- Education: Scuola Normale Superiore
- Awards: Caccioppoli Prize (1990)
- Scientific career
- Fields: Mathematics
- Workplaces: International School for Advanced Studies
- Doctoral advisor: Ennio De Giorgi
- Doctoral students: Adriana Garroni

Gianni Dal Maso (born 1954) is an Italian mathematician who is active in the fields of partial differential equations, calculus of variations and applied mathematics.

== Scientific activity ==
Dal Maso studied at Scuola Normale Superiore under the guidance of Ennio De Giorgi and is professor of mathematics at the International School for Advanced Studies at Trieste, where he also serves as deputy director. Dal Maso has dealt with a number of questions related to partial differential equations and calculus of variations, covering a range of topics going from lower semicontinuity problems for multiple integrals to existence theorem for so called free discontinuity problems, from the study of asymptotic behaviour of variational problems via so called Γ-convergence methods to fine properties of solutions to obstacle problems. In the last years he has been considerably involved in the study of problems arising from applied mathematics, developing methods aimed at describing the evolution of fractures in plasticity problems.

== Recognition ==
Dal Maso has been awarded the Caccioppoli prize in 1990, the "Medaglia dei XL per la Matematica" by the Accademia Nazionale delle Scienze, the Prize of the Minister for the Cultural Heritage for Mathematics and Mechanics by the Accademia Nazionale dei Lincei in 2003 and the Amerio prize by the Istituto Lombardo Accademia di Scienze e Lettere in 2005. He has been invited speaker and the third European Congress of Mathematics in 2000 and EMS lecturer in 2002. In 2012 he has been awarded an ERC grant.
