= RACSAM =

- Discipline: Mathematics
- Language: English
- Edited by: Real Academia de Ciencias Exactas, Físicas y Naturales (RACSAM)

Publication details
- History: 2001-present
- Publisher: Springer (Spain)
- Frequency: 1 volume per year, 4 issues per volume
- Open access: Hybrid
- Impact factor: 1.406 (2019)

Standard abbreviations
- ISO 4: RACSAM
- MathSciNet: Rev. R. Acad. Cienc. Exactas Fís. Nat. Ser. A Mat.

Indexing
- ISSN: 1578-7303 (print); 1579-1505 (web)
- LCCN: 2003234441

Links
- Journal homepage

RACSAM (Revista de la Real Academia de Ciencias Exactas, Físicas y Naturales, Series A Matemáticas, Journal of the Spanish Royal Academy of Sciences, Series A Mathematics) is the mathematical journal of the Spanish Royal Academy of Sciences. It publishes research papers exclusively in English.

== History ==
RACSAM was created on March 7th, 2001 by the mathematics department of the Spanish Royal Academy of Sciences. The journal publishes one volume per year, and all papers are in English. Its first editor-in-chief was Prof. Jesús Ildefonso Díaz (2001-2005). It is a series of the journal Revista de la Real Academia de Ciencias Exactas, Físicas y Naturales, founded in 1905, a generic journal covering physical and natural sciences as well as mathematics. As a result, both journals have the same volume numbering. In 2005, Prof. Manuel Lopez-Pellicer became the editor-in-chief of the journal. It was published by the Royal Academy until 2010, then by Springer in 2011. It entered the Journal Citation Reports in 2011 and was ranked 56th out of 309 journals in the Mathematical Sciences Section of the 2017 Journal Citation Reports. The RACSAM papers in the years 2001-2010 appear in open access at the website. As from 2008, they appear at the Springer journal site.

== Evolution ==
The following table presents the evolution of the number of citations of RACSAM:

Year	2009	2010	2011	2012	2013	2014	2015	2016	2017
Total citations	102	104	91	149	171	208	221	295	430

The following table presents the ranking evolution of RACSAM:

Year	2009	2010	2011	2012	2013	2014	2015	2016	2017
Rank	193/255	216/279	239/289	84/296	98/302	95/312	223/312	140/311	56/309
Quartile	Q4	Q4	Q4	Q2	Q2	Q2	Q3	Q2	Q1
Impact Factor	0.425	0.400	0.340	0.733	0.689	0.776	0.468	0.690	1.074

== Abstracting and indexing ==
RACSAM is in Current Contents (Physical Chemical and Earth Sciences), ISI Web of Science, MathSciNet, Zentralblatt MATH, Scopus, and Google Scholar.
