= Fermat Prize =

Mathematics award

- Native name: Prix Fermat
- Description: Biennial award rewarding mathematical research in fields where the contributions of Pierre de Fermat were decisive
- Location: Toulouse
- Country: France
- Presented by: Institut de Mathématiques de Toulouse
- Website: http://www.math.univ-toulouse.fr/FermatPrize

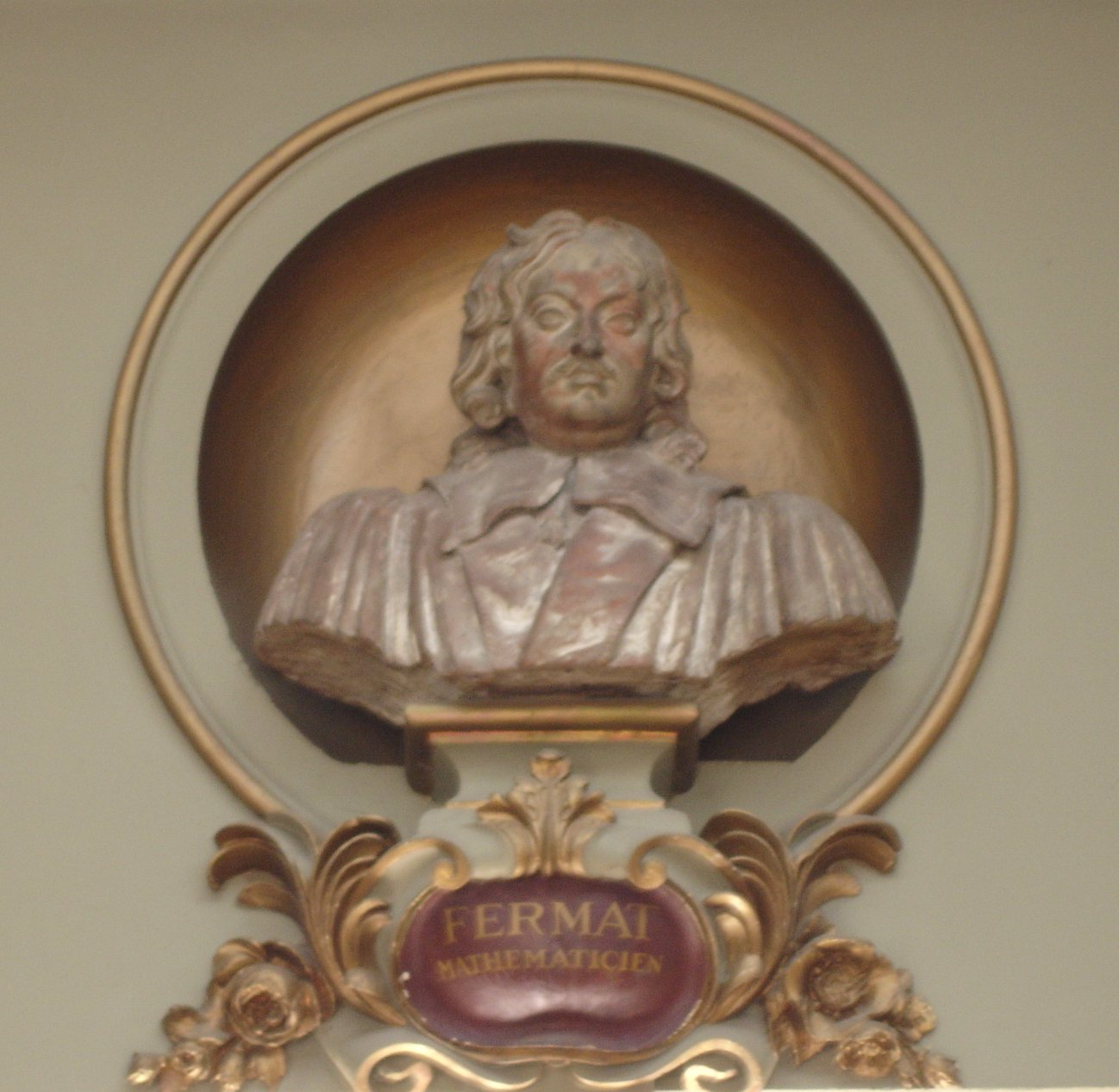
France, Haute-Garonne (31), Toulouse, Salle des Illustres at the Capitole, Pierre de Fermat.

The Fermat Prize of mathematical research biennially rewards research works in fields where the contributions of Pierre de Fermat have been decisive:

- Statements of variational principles
- Foundations of probability and analytic geometry
- Number theory.

The spirit of the prize is focused on rewarding the results of research accessible to the greatest number of professional mathematicians within these fields. The Fermat Prize was created in 1989 and is awarded once every two years in Toulouse by the Institut de Mathématiques de Toulouse. The amount of the Fermat Prize has been fixed at 20,000 Euros for the twelfth edition (2011).

== Previous prize winners ==
Year	Prize Winners	Citation
1989	Abbas Bahri	"for the introduction of new methods in the calculus of variations"
1989	Kenneth Ribet	"for his contribution to number theory and Fermat's Last Theorem"
1991	Jean-Louis Colliot-Thélène	"for his work on number theory and rational manifolds the research for which was undertaken to a large extent with Jean-Jacques Sansuc"
1993	Jean-Michel Coron	"for his contributions to the study of variational problems and control theory"
1995	Andrew Wiles	"for his works on the Taniyama–Shimura–Weil conjecture which resulted in the demonstration of the proof of Fermat's Last Theorem"
1997	Michel Talagrand	"for his fundamental contributions in various domains of probability"
1999	Fabrice Béthuel	"for several important contributions to the theory of variational calculus, which have consequences in Physics and Geometry"
1999	Frédéric Hélein	"for several important contributions to the theory of variational calculus, which have consequences in Physics and Geometry"
2001	Richard Taylor	"for his various contributions to the study of links between Galois representations and automorphic forms"
2001	Wendelin Werner	"for his works on the intersection exponents of Brownian motion and their impact in theoretical Physics"
2003	Luigi Ambrosio	"for his impressive contributions to the calculus of variations and geometric measure theory, and their link with partial differential equations"
2005	Pierre Colmez	"for his contributions to the study of L-functions and p-adic Galois representations"
2005	Jean-François Le Gall	"for his contributions to the fine analysis of planar Brownian motions, his invention of the Brownian snake and its applications to the study of non-linear partial differential equations"
2007	Chandrashekhar Khare	"for his proof (with Jean-Pierre Wintenberger) of the Serre modularity conjecture in number theory"
2009	Elon Lindenstrauss	"for his contributions to ergodic theory and their applications in number theory"
2009	Cédric Villani	"for his contributions to the theory of optimal transport and his studies of non-linear evolution equations"
2011	Manjul Bhargava	"for his work on various generalizations of the Davenport-Heilbronn estimates and for his recent startling results (with Arul Shankar) on the average rank of elliptic curves"
2011	Igor Rodnianski	"for his fundamental contributions to the studies of the equations of general relativity and to the propagation of the light on the space-time curves (in collaboration with Mihalis Dafermos, Sergiu Klainerman, and Hans Lindblad)"
2013	Camillo De Lellis	"for his fundamental contributions (in collaboration with László Székelyhidi) to the conjecture of Onsager about dissipative solutions of the Euler-equations and for his work to the regularity of minimal surfaces"
2013	Martin Hairer	"for his contributions to the analysis of stochastic partial differential equations, especially for the regularity of their solutions and convergence to the equilibrium"
2015	Laure Saint-Raymond	"for the development of asymptotic theories of partial differential equations, including the fluid limits of rarefied flows, multiscale analysis in plasma physics equations and ocean modeling, and the derivation of the Boltzmann equation from interacting particle systems"
2015	Peter Scholze	"for his invention of perfectoid spaces and their application to fundamental problems in algebraic geometry and in the theory of automorphic forms"
2017	Simon Brendle	"for his numerous and profound results in geometric analysis, involving partial differential equations of elliptic, parabolic and hyperbolic type; in particular for his elegant proof of Lawson's conjecture, for his characterization of soliton solutions of Ricci flows and mean curvature in dimension 3 as well as for his remarkable contributions, in collaboration with Gerhard Huisken, to the analysis of mean curvature flow of mean convex surfaces in manifolds of dimension 3"
2017	Nader Masmoudi	"for his remarkable work of depth and creativity in the analysis of nonlinear partial differential equations and in particular for his recent contributions to the rigorous and complete resolution of hydrodynamic stability problems raised at the end of the 19th century by the founding fathers of modern fluid mechanics"
2019	Alexei Borodin	"for the invention of integrable probability theory, a new area at the interface of representation theory, combinatorics and statistical physics"
2019	Maryna Viazovska	"for her original solution of the famous sphere packing problem in dimensions 8 and 24"
2021	Fernando Codá Marques	"for major advances obtained with André Neves on geometric applications of the calculus of variations"
2021	Vincent Pilloni	"for his remarkable results in arithmetic geometry on p-adic modular forms, in particular through the introduction and development of higher Hida theory"
2023	Jason P. Miller	"for his major advances in random geometry, including relation to Liouville quantum gravity (partly with Scott Sheffield)."
2023	Aaron Naber	"for his groundbreaking work on Ricci limit spaces, in particular rectifiability, isometry group and co-dimension 4 conjecture."
2025	Vesselin Dimitrov	"for major advances in number theory, Diophantine geometry and theory of modular forms."
2025	Vlad Vicol	"for deep and transformative breakthroughs in the mathematical analysis of equations of fluid mechanics and turbulence."

== Pierre Fermat medal ==
There has also been a Pierre Fermat medal, which has been awarded for example to chemist Linus Pauling (1957), mathematician Ernst Peschl (1965) and botanist Francis Raymond Fosberg.

== Junior Fermat Prize ==
The Junior Fermat Prize is a mathematical prize, awarded every two years to a student in the first four years of university for a contribution to mathematics. The amount of the prize is 2000 Euros.

== See also ==
- List of mathematics awards
