= Jesús Ildefonso Díaz =

Spanish mathematician

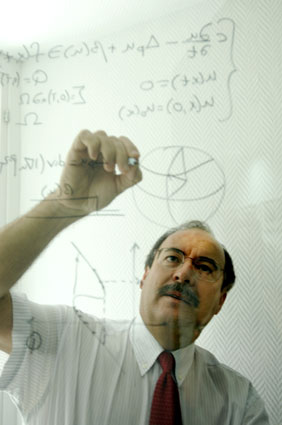
- Jesús Ildefonso Díaz
- Born: 11 December 1950 (age 75); Toledo, Spain
- Education: Universidad Complutense de Madrid
- Known for: Research on partial differential equations
- Awards: Member, Spanish Royal Academy of Sciences
- Scientific career
- Fields: Mathematics
- Workplaces: Universidad Complutense de Madrid
- Doctoral advisor: Alberto Dou; Haïm Brezis

Jesús Ildefonso Díaz is a Spanish mathematician who works in partial differential equations. He is a professor at Complutense University of Madrid (UCM) and a member of the Spanish Royal Academy of Sciences.

== Biography ==
Díaz was born in Toledo, Spain on December 11, 1950. He graduated in mathematics from UCM in 1973, and obtained his PhD from the same university in 1976. His Ph.D. thesis advisors were Alberto Dou and Haïm Brezis.

== Career ==
Díaz joined the faculty at UCM as an Associate Professor in Mathematical Analysis in 1978. He moved briefly to the University of Santander in 1980, before returning to UCM as a full professor in 1983. In 1998, he co-founded the journal Revista Matemática de la UCM and served on its editorial board from 1988 to 1995. He founded the Department of Applied Mathematics at the Facultad de Matemáticas of UCM in the early 1980s and led it for several years. In 2006, he founded the Instituto de Matemática Interdisciplinar (IMI), serving as Director from 2006 to 2008 and again from 2012 to 2016. He is an energetic teacher, organizing six summer courses at UCM, two of them with Jacques Louis Lions.

Díaz has worked in many areas of applied mathematics, such as theoretical and applied aspects of nonlinear partial differential equations, fluid mechanics models, geophysical models, reaction-diffusion models, elasticity and homogenization models and control theory models, among others. He has also worked in areas closer to pure mathematics, such as nonlinear analysis, focusing on accretive operators, rearrangement and gradient estimates. Other activities include contributions in science history, science communication and scientific management. His mentors and influential colleagues include Philippe Benilan and Jacques Louis Lions.

As of July 2019, his research publications included more than 250 papers in research journals, 141 contributions published in proceedings of meetings, seven books, eight book chapters and 20 edited volumes. His popular science works include 43 articles, two memoirs, two contributions to published proceedings and 17 chapters in books. He has collaborated with over 175 researchers. Since 1979, he has been advisor for 20 Ph.D. dissertations (all at UCM). He has 106 scientific "descendants".

== Awards and honors ==
- 2015: Grand Prix Jacques-Louis Lions de Mathématiques Appliquées of the Académie des Sciences (France).
- 1997: Member of the Spanish Royal Academy of Sciences.
- 1996: Doctorate "Honoris Causa" from the University of Pau and Pays de l'Adour.
- 1980: Mathematics Prize of the Spanish Royal Academy of Sciences, 1980.

== Congresses and scientific academies ==
Díaz was instrumental in the organization of the Spanish Congress of Differential Equations and Applications, an annual national meeting held from 1978 to 1987. This meeting catalyzed discussions in 1988 on the need for a national society. With Antonio Valle (University of Málaga), Díaz co-founded the Sociedad Española de Matemática Aplicada (SEMA), serving as the society's Secretary from its founding in 1991 to 1994, and as its second President, after Valle, from 1994 to 1995.

He was influential in the reformation of the Spanish Royal Society of Mathematics in 1997, after it had been inactive for several years. As a member of the Spanish Royal Academy of Sciences, he worked to modernize the academy's activities. He was the founder of the mathematics section of the Journal of the Spanish Royal Academy of Sciences, Series A Mathematics (RACSAM), serving as editor-in-chief from 2001 to 2005. He encouraged links between the academy and the French Academy of Sciences, co-organizing a joint congress "Les Mathématiques et l'environnement", held in Paris.

He is responsible for the fact that the word modelizar was accepted by the Royal Academy of the Spanish Language and included in the Spanish Official Dictionary as the correct Spanish translation for the English word modelling.

== International relationships ==
As a result of his activities to connect Spanish and French mathematicians, he was appointed to visiting positions in many French universities, including the Universities of Toulouse, Nancy, Pau, Metz, Tours, Poitiers, Paris VI and Montpellier. He organized several French-Spanish congresses on various topics.

He has also been appointed as an honorary member of the Mathematics Research Center, University of Wisconsin–Madison, USA, and Visiting Professor at the University of Rome II and the University of L'Aquila). He organized the NATO Advanced Study Institute on the Mathematics of Models for Climatology and Environment in 1995.

From 2009 to 2013 he was European Coordinator of the European Programme FIRST (Fronts and Interfaces in Science and Technologies), with a €4 million budget and activities in 11 countries.

== Editorial boards ==
From September 2003 to June 2014 he was the only Spanish person on the editorial board of the Journal of the European Mathematical Society. He serves on the editorial boards of several other journals including:

- Advances in Mathematical Science and Applications (since 1991)
- Revista de la Real Academia de Ciencias Exactas, Físicas y Naturales de Madrid (since 1996)
- Electronic Differential Equations Journal (since 2001).
- Differential and Integral Equations (since 2001).
- Electronic Journal of Mathematical and Physical Sciences (since 2002).
- Journal of the European Mathematical Society (since 2003).
- The Annals of the University of Craiova - Mathematics and Computer Science (since 2006).
- Nonlinear Analysis: Real World Applications (since 2010).
- Differential Equations and Applications (DEA) (since 2011).
- Abstract and Applied Analysis (since July 2012).

== 60th birthday celebration ==
An International Congress was organized to celebrate Díaz's 60th birthday, entitled "Non-linear models in partial differential equations: A conference on the occasion of Jesús Ildefonso Díaz's 60th birthday". The meeting took place on June, 14-17, 2011, in the Palacio de Lorenzana, (UCLM) in Toledo, Spain (Ildefonso's birthplace). The members of the Scientific Committee were Professors Haïm Brezis (President), H. Ammann, S.N. Antontsev, A. Friedman, R. Glowinski, A. Liñán, E. Sánchez-Palencia, and R. Temam. Two special issues of the journal Differential Equations and Applications were dedicated to the meeting proceedings (Differential Equations and Applications Vol. 3, Issue 4 (2011) and Vol. 4 Issue 1 (2012)). ISSN 1847-120X.
