= Hilbert's nineteenth problem =

When are solutions in the calculus of variations analytic

Hilbert's nineteenth problem is one of the 23 Hilbert problems, set out in a list compiled by David Hilbert in 1900. It asks whether the solutions of regular problems in the calculus of variations are always analytic. Informally, and perhaps less directly, since Hilbert's concept of a "regular variational problem" identifies this precisely as a variational problem whose Euler–Lagrange equation is an elliptic partial differential equation with analytic coefficients, Hilbert's nineteenth problem, despite its seemingly technical statement, simply asks whether, in this class of partial differential equations, any solution inherits the relatively simple and well understood property of being an analytic function from the equation it satisfies. Hilbert's nineteenth problem was solved independently in the late 1950s by Ennio De Giorgi and John Forbes Nash, Jr.

== History ==
=== The origins of the problem ===
One of the most remarkable facts in the elements of the theory of analytic functions appears to me to be this: that there exist partial differential equations whose integrals are all of necessity analytic functions of the independent variables, that is, in short, equations susceptible of none but analytic solutions.

— David Hilbert, (Hilbert 1900, p. 288).

David Hilbert presented what is now called his nineteenth problem in his speech at the second International Congress of Mathematicians. In (Hilbert 1900, p. 288) he states that, in his opinion, one of the most remarkable facts of the theory of analytic functions is that there exist classes of partial differential equations which admit only analytic functions as solutions, listing Laplace's equation, Liouville's equation, the minimal surface equation and a class of linear partial differential equations studied by Émile Picard as examples. He then notes that most partial differential equations sharing this property are Euler–Lagrange equations of a well defined kind of variational problem, satisfying the following three properties:

(1) ${\iint F(p,q,z;x,y) dx dy} = \text{Minimum} \qquad \left[ \frac{\partial z}{\partial x}=p \quad;\quad \frac{\partial z}{\partial y}=q \right]$,
(2) $\frac{\partial^2 F}{\partial^2 p}\cdot\frac{\partial^2 F}{\partial^2 q} - \left(\frac{\partial^2 F}{{\partial p}{\partial q}}\right)^2 > 0$,
(3) F is an analytic function of all its arguments p, q, z, x and y.

Hilbert calls this a "regular variational problem". Property (1) means that these are minimum problems. Property (2) is the ellipticity condition on the Euler–Lagrange equations associated to the given functional, while property (3) is a simple regularity assumption about the function F. Having identified the class of problems considered, he poses the following question: "... does every Lagrangian partial differential equation of a regular variation problem have the property of admitting analytic integrals exclusively?" He asks further if this is the case even when the function is required to assume boundary values that are continuous, but not analytic, as happens for Dirichlet's problem for the potential function .

=== The path to the complete solution ===
Hilbert stated his nineteenth problem as a regularity problem for a class of elliptic partial differential equation with analytic coefficients. Therefore the first efforts of researchers who sought to solve it were aimed at studying the regularity of classical solutions for equations belonging to this class. For C 3 solutions, Hilbert's problem was answered positively by Sergei Bernstein (1904) in his thesis. He showed that C 3 solutions of nonlinear elliptic analytic equations in two variables are analytic. Bernstein's result was improved over the years by several authors, such as Petrowsky (1939), who reduced the differentiability requirements on the solution needed to prove that it is analytic. On the other hand, direct methods in the calculus of variations showed the existence of solutions with very weak differentiability properties. For many years there was a gap between these results. The solutions that could be constructed were known to have square integrable second derivatives, but this was not quite strong enough to feed into the machinery that could prove they were analytic, which needed continuity of first derivatives. This gap was filled independently by Ennio De Giorgi (1956, 1957), and John Forbes Nash (1957, 1958), who were able to show the solutions had first derivatives that were Hölder continuous. By previous results this implied that the solutions are analytic whenever the differential equation has analytic coefficients, thus completing the solution of Hilbert's nineteenth problem. Subsequently, Jürgen Moser gave an alternate proof of the results obtained by Ennio De Giorgi (1956, 1957), and John Forbes Nash (1957, 1958).

=== Counterexamples to various generalizations of the problem ===
The affirmative answer to Hilbert's nineteenth problem given by Ennio De Giorgi and John Forbes Nash raised the question if the same conclusion holds also for Euler–Lagrange equations of more general functionals. At the end of the 1960s, Maz'ya (1968), De Giorgi (1968) and Giusti & Miranda (1968) independently constructed several counterexamples, showing that in general there is no hope of proving such regularity results without adding further hypotheses.

Precisely, Maz'ya (1968) gave several counterexamples involving a single elliptic equation of order greater than two with analytic coefficients. For experts, the fact that such equations could have nonanalytic and even nonsmooth solutions created a sensation.

De Giorgi (1968) and Giusti & Miranda (1968) gave counterexamples showing that in the case when the solution is vector-valued rather than scalar-valued, it need not be analytic; the example of De Giorgi consists of an elliptic system with bounded coefficients, while the one of Giusti and Miranda has analytic coefficients. Later, Nečas (1977) provided other, more refined, examples for the vector valued problem.

== De Giorgi's theorem ==
The key theorem proved by De Giorgi is an a priori estimate stating that if u is a solution of a suitable linear second order strictly elliptic PDE of the form

$$D_i(a^{ij}(x)\,D_ju)=0$$

and $u$ has square integrable first derivatives, then $u$ is Hölder continuous.

== Application of De Giorgi's theorem to Hilbert's problem ==
Hilbert's problem asks whether the minimizers $w$ of an energy functional such as

$$\int_UL(Dw)\,\mathrm{d}x$$

are analytic. Here $w$ is a function on some compact set $U$ of R^{n}, $Dw$ is its gradient vector, and $L$ is the Lagrangian, a function of the derivatives of $w$ that satisfies certain growth, smoothness, and convexity conditions. The smoothness of $w$ can be shown using De Giorgi's theorem as follows. The Euler–Lagrange equation for this variational problem is the non-linear equation

$$\sum\limits_{i=1}^n(L_{p_i}(Dw))_{x_i} = 0$$

and differentiating this with respect to $x_k$ gives

$$\sum\limits_{i=1}^n(L_{p_ip_j}(Dw)w_{x_jx_k})_{x_i} = 0$$

This means that $u=w_{x_k}$ satisfies the linear equation

$$D_i(a^{ij}(x)D_ju)=0$$

with

$$a^{ij} = L_{p_ip_j}(Dw)$$

so by De Giorgi's result the solution w has Hölder continuous first derivatives, provided the matrix $L_{p_ip_j}$ is bounded. When this is not the case, a further step is needed: one must prove that the solution $w$ is Lipschitz continuous, i.e. the gradient $Dw$ is an $L^\infty$ function.

Once w is known to have Hölder continuous (n+1)st derivatives for some n ≥ 1, then the coefficients a^{ij} have Hölder continuous nth derivatives, so a theorem of Schauder implies that the (n+2)nd derivatives are also Hölder continuous, so repeating this infinitely often shows that the solution w is smooth.

== Nash's theorem ==
John Nash gave a continuity estimate for solutions of the parabolic equation

$$D_i(a^{ij}(x)D_ju)=D_t(u)$$

where u is a bounded function of x_{1},...,x_{n}, t defined for t ≥ 0. From his estimate Nash was able to deduce a continuity estimate for solutions of the elliptic equation

$D_i(a^{ij}(x)D_ju)=0$ by considering the special case when u does not depend on t.
