= Alain-Sol Sznitman =

French mathematician

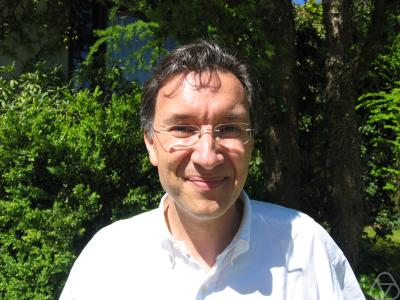
Sznitman in 2005

Alain-Sol Sznitman (born 13 December 1955) is a French and Swiss mathematician who works as a professor of mathematics at ETH Zurich. His research concerns probability theory and mathematical physics. Within the field of percolation theory, Sznitman introduced the study of random interlacements.

== Education and career ==
Sznitman did his undergraduate studies at the École Normale Supérieure, and earned a Doctorat d'Etat in 1983 from Pierre and Marie Curie University, under the supervision of Jacques Neveu. He worked at the Courant Institute of Mathematical Sciences at New York University beginning in 1983 and was promoted to full professor there in 1990. He moved to ETH Zurich in 1991, and from 1995 to 1999 was director of the Institute for Mathematical Research at ETH Zurich. He is a dual citizen of France and Switzerland.

== Recognition ==
In 1991, Sznitman won the Rollo Davidson Prize, given annually to an early-career probabilist, and in 1999 he won the Line and Michel Loève International Prize in Probability. He became a fellow of the Institute of Mathematical Statistics in 1997, and of the American Mathematical Society in 2012. He was an invited speaker at the International Congress of Mathematicians in 1998.
