= Andrea Braides =

Italian mathematician (born 1961)

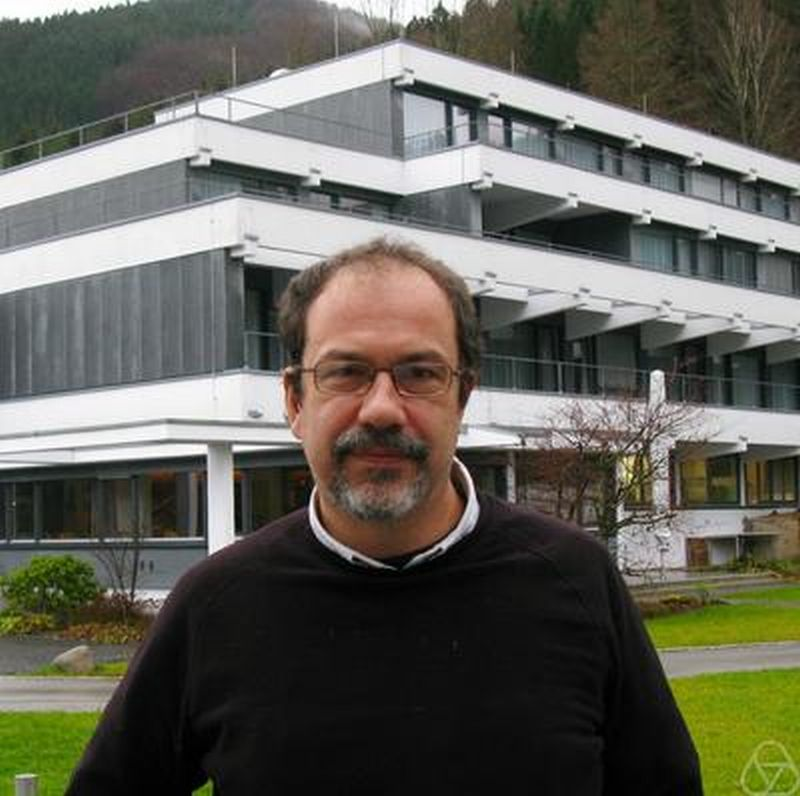
Braides at Oberwolfach, 2011

Andrea Braides (born 12 April 1961) is an Italian mathematician, specializing in the calculus of variations. He is a professor at the University of Rome Tor Vergata and at the International School for Advanced Studies (SISSA) in Triest.

== Education and career ==
Born in Udine, Braides studied at the University of Pisa and Scuola Normale Superiore obtaining the degree in Mathematics (Laurea) in 1983 (Gamma-Limits of Functionals in the Calculus of Variations) supervised by Ennio De Giorgi and then at the corsi di perfezionamento (course of higher specialization) at Scuola Normale Superiore. He taught at the University of Udine in 1985–86 and then served two years of servizio civile. At the University of Brescia, he became in 1988 a research associate and in 1992 an associate professor. From 1995 to 2000 he was an associate professor at SISSA in Triest and from 2000 to the present a full professor at the University of Rome Tor Vergata.

He was a visiting professor at the Tata Institute of Fundamental Research (in 1994 and again in 2004), at the Max Planck Institute for Mathematics in the Sciences in Leipzig (in 1998), at Caltech, at the Centre Émile Borel in Paris, at the Isaac Newton Institute, at the University of Paris VI and the University of Paris XIII, at Carnegie-Mellon University, at Stanford University (Timoshenko scholar) and at the department of aerospace engineering at the University of Minnesota. He was a one-year visiting fellow at Mansfied College and visiting professor at the Mathematical Institute in Oxford in 2013–14.

Braides has done research on the calculus of variations, Gamma convergence, asymptotic homogenization, discrete variational problems, percolation, fracture mechanics, image processing, free-discontinuity problems, and geometric measure theory.

In 2014 he was an Invited Speaker at the International Congress of Mathematicians in Seoul with talk Discrete-to-continuum variational methods for lattice systems.

On the occasion of his 60th birthday he was the dedicatee of the international conference "Calculus of Variations. Back to Carthage" held in Carthage, Tunisia from 16–20 May 2022.

== Selected publications ==
- Braides, Andrea; Defranceschi, Anneliese (1998). Homogenization of Multiple Integrals. Cham: Oxford University Press. ISBN 978-0-19-850246-3. OCLC 554049490.
- Braides, Andrea (1998). Approximation of free-discontinuity problems. Berlin: Springer-Verlag. ISBN 978-3-540-68714-6. OCLC 159957436.
- Braides, Andrea (2002). Gamma-convergence for beginners. New York: Oxford University Press. ISBN 978-0-19-850784-0. OCLC 50510861.
- Braides, Andrea (2006). "Chapter 2 A handbook of Г-convergence". Handbook of Differential Equations: Stationary Partial Differential Equations. Vol. 3. Elsevier. pp. 101–213. doi:10.1016/s1874-5733(06)80006-9. ISBN 978-0-444-52846-9. ISSN 1874-5733.
- Braides, Andrea (2014). "Local Minimization, Variational Evolution and Γ-Convergence". Lecture Notes in Mathematics. Vol. 2094. Cham: Springer International Publishing. doi:10.1007/978-3-319-01982-6. ISBN 978-3-319-01981-9. ISSN 0075-8434.
- Braides, Andrea; Solci, Margherita (2021). Geometric Flows on Planar Lattices. Cham: Birkhäuser. ISBN 978-3-030-69916-1. OCLC 1243305537.
- Braides, Andrea; Chiadò Piat, Valeria (2006). Topics on concentration phenomena and problems with multiple scales. Berlin: Springer. ISBN 978-3-540-36546-4. OCLC 262693199.
- Braides, Andrea; Maria, Stella Gelli (2006). "From discrete systems to continuous variational problems: An introduction". Topics on Concentration Phenomena and Problems with Multiple Scales. Lecture Notes of the Unione Matematica Italiana. Vol. 2. Springer Berlin Heidelberg. pp. 3–77. doi:10.1007/978-3-540-36546-4_1. ISBN 978-3-540-36241-8.
