= Mikhail Lyubich =

Ukrainian mathematician

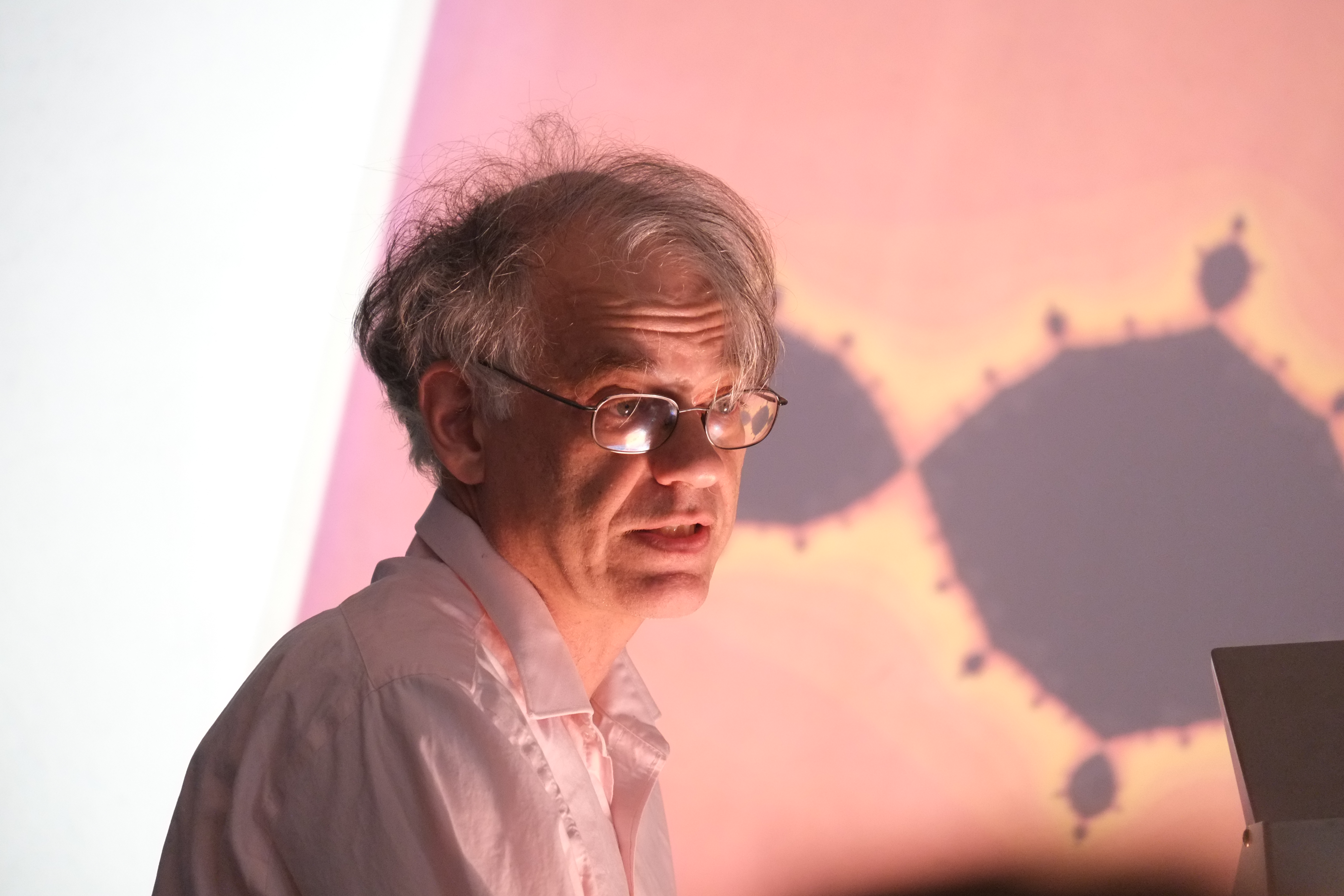
- Born: February 25, 1959 (age 67); Kharkiv, Ukrainian SSR, USSR
- Education: Kharkov State University
- Known for: Complex dynamics
- Scientific career
- Fields: Mathematics
- Workplaces: Stony Brook; Toronto
- Doctoral advisor: Yuri Illich Lyubich

Mikhail (Misha) Lyubich (born 25 February 1959 in Kharkiv, Ukraine) is a mathematician who has made important contributions to the fields of holomorphic dynamics and chaos theory.

== Education ==
Lyubich graduated from Kharkiv University with a master's degree in 1980, and obtained his PhD from Tashkent University in 1984.

== Career ==
Currently, he is a Professor of Mathematics at Stony Brook University and the Director of the Institute of Mathematical Sciences at Stony Brook. From 2002-2008, he also held a position of Canada Research Chair at the University of Toronto.

He is credited with several important contributions to the study of dynamical systems. In his 1984 Ph.D. thesis, he proved fundamental results on ergodic theory and the structural stability of rational mapping. Due to this work, the measure of maximal entropy of a rational map (the Mané-Lyubich measure) bears his name. In 1999, he published the first non-numerical proof of the universality of the Feigenbaum constants in chaos theory.

He received the 2010 Jeffery–Williams Prize from the Canadian Mathematical Society. In 2012, he became a fellow of the American Mathematical Society. He was selected as one of the plenary speakers for the 2014 ICM in Seoul.
