= Almgren regularity theorem =

Theorem about mass-minimizing surfaces

In geometric measure theory, a field of mathematics, the Almgren regularity theorem, proved by Almgren (1983, 2000), states that the singular set of a mass-minimizing surface has codimension at least 2. Almgren's proof of this was 955 pages long. Within the proof many new ideas are introduced, such as monotonicity of a frequency function and the use of a center manifold to perform a more intricate blow-up procedure.

A streamlined and more accessible proof of Almgren's regularity theorem, following the same ideas as Almgren, was given by Camillo De Lellis and Emanuele Spadaro in a series of three papers.
