= Journal of the European Mathematical Society =

- Discipline: Pure and applied mathematics
- Language: English
- Edited by: Anton Alekseev; Susanna Terracini

Publication details
- History: 1999–present
- Publisher: European Mathematical Society
- Frequency: Monthly
- Open access: no
- Impact factor: 2.6 (2022)

Standard abbreviations
- ISO 4: J. Eur. Math. Soc.
- MathSciNet: J. Eur. Math. Soc. (JEMS)

Indexing
- ISSN: 1435-9855 (print); 1435-9863 (web)
- OCLC no.: 614880774

Links
- Journal homepage; Online access

Journal of the European Mathematical Society is a monthly peer-reviewed mathematical journal. Founded in 1999, the journal publishes articles on all areas of pure and applied mathematics.

Most published articles are original research articles but the journal also publishes survey articles. The journal has been published by Springer until 2003. Since 2004, it is published by the European Mathematical Society. The first editor-in-chief was Jürgen Jost, followed in 2004 by Haïm Brezis.

The journal was founded in order to promote interdisciplinary work within the mathematical community and to preserve unity across pure and applied mathematics.

== Abstracting and indexing ==
The journal is abstracted in:

- Mathematical Reviews
- Current Mathematical Publications
- MathSciNet
- Zentralblatt für Mathematik
- Zentralblatt MATH
- Science Citation Index Expanded
- CompuMath Citation Index
- Current Contents / Physical, Chemical & Earth Sciences
- ISI Alerting Services
- Journal Citation Reports/Science Edition

== See also ==
- List of the journals published by the European Mathematical Society
