= Abbas Bahri =

Tunisian mathematician

- Born: 1 January 1955; Tunis, Tunisia
- Died: 10 January 2016 (aged 61)
- Education: Pierre-and-Marie-Curie University
- Occupations: Mathematician, Professor at Rutgers University

Abbas Bahri (1 January 1955 – 10 January 2016) was a Tunisian mathematician. He was the winner of the Fermat Prize and the Langevin Prize in mathematics. He was a professor of mathematics at Rutgers University.

He mainly studied the calculus of variations, partial differential equations, and differential geometry. He introduced the method of the critical points at infinity, which is a fundamental step in the calculus of variations.

== Biography ==
Bahri received his secondary education in Tunisia and higher education in France. He attended the École Normale Superieure in Paris in 1974, the first Tunisian to do so.

In 1981, he completed his PhD from Pierre-and-Marie-Curie University. His dissertation advisor was the French mathematician Haïm Brezis. Afterwards, he was a visiting scientist at the University of Chicago.

In October 1981, Bahri became a lecturer in mathematics at the University of Tunis. He taught as a lecturer at the École Polytechnique from 1984 to 1993. In 1988, he became a tenured professor at Rutgers University. At Rutgers, he was director of the Center for Nonlinear Analysis from 1988 to 2002.

=== Personal life ===
He married Diana Nunziante on 20 June 1991. His wife is from Italy and they had four children. On 10 January 2016, he died following a long illness at the age of 61.

== Awards ==
In 1989, Bahri won the Fermat Prize for Mathematics, jointly with Kenneth Alan Ribet, for his introduction of new methods in the calculus of variations.

== Works ==
- Pseudo-orbits of contact forms (1988)
- Critical Points at Infinity in Some Variational Problems (1989)
- Classical and Quantic Periodic Motions of Multiply Polarized Spin-Particles (1998)
- Flow lines and algebraic invariants in contact form geometry (2003)
- Recent progress in conformal geometry with Yongzhong Xu (2007)

=== Selected publications ===
- Bahri, Abbas (August 2009). "Variations at infinity in contact form geometry". Journal of Fixed Point Theory & Its Applications. 5 (2): 265–289. doi:10.1007/s11784-009-0102-0. S2CID 120456000.
- Bahri, Abbas; Taimonov, Iskander A. (July 1998). "Periodic Orbits in Magnetic Fields and Ricci Curvature of Lagrangian Systems" (PDF). Transactions of the American Mathematical Society. 350 (7): 2697–2717. arXiv:dg-ga/9511016. doi:10.1090/s0002-9947-98-02108-4. S2CID 15064503.
