= Ergodic Theory and Dynamical Systems =

- Discipline: Dynamical systems
- Language: English
- Edited by: Mark Pollicott, Sebastian van Strien

Publication details
- History: 1981–present
- Publisher: Cambridge University Press
- Impact factor: 0.822 (2009)

Standard abbreviations
- ISO 4: Ergod. Theory Dyn. Syst.
- MathSciNet: Ergodic Theory Dynam. Systems

Indexing
- ISSN: 0143-3857 (print); 1469-4417 (web)
- LCCN: 83643957

Links
- Journal homepage

Ergodic Theory and Dynamical Systems is a peer-reviewed mathematics journal published by Cambridge University Press. Established in 1981, the journal publishes articles on dynamical systems. The journal is indexed by Mathematical Reviews and Zentralblatt MATH. Its 2009 impact factor was 0.822.
