= Tristan Rivière =

French mathematician

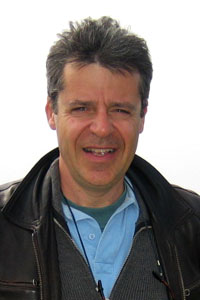
- Tristan Rivière at Ushant Island, 2011
- Born: 26 November 1967 (age 58); Brest, France
- Education: Pierre and Marie Curie University (Ph.D., 1993)
- Awards: Bronze Medal of the CNRS (1996); Stampacchia Medal (2003)
- Scientific career
- Fields: Calculus of variations, Partial differential equations
- Workplaces: ETH Zurich
- Doctoral advisor: Fabrice Bethuel

Tristan Rivière (born 1967) is a French mathematician, working on partial differential equations and the calculus of variations.

== Biography ==
Rivière studied at the École Polytechnique and obtained his PhD in 1993 at the Pierre and Marie Curie University, under the supervision of Fabrice Bethuel, with a thesis on harmonic maps between manifolds. In 1992 he was appointed chargé de recherche at CNRS. In 1997 he received his habilitation at the University of Paris-Sud in Orsay. From 1999 to 2000 he was a visiting associate professor at the Courant Institute of Mathematical Sciences (New York University). Since 2003 he is full professor at ETH Zurich and since 2009 he is the Director of the Institute for Mathematical Research at ETH.

== Research activity ==
His research interests include partial differential equations in physics (liquid crystals, Bose–Einstein condensates, micromagnetics, Ginzburg–Landau theory of superconductivity, gauge theory) and differential geometry (harmonic maps between manifolds, geometric flows, minimal surfaces, the Willmore functional and Yang–Mills fields). His work focuses in particular on non-linear phenomena, formation of vortices, energy quantization and regularity issues.

== Awards and recognition ==
In 1996 he received the Bronze Medal of the CNRS, while in 2003 he was awarded the first Stampacchia Medal. In 2002 he was an invited speaker at the International Congress of Mathematicians in Beijing, where he gave a talk on bubbling, quantization and regularity issues in geometric non-linear analysis.

== Selected publications ==
- "Everywhere discontinuous Harmonic Maps into Spheres." Acta Mathematica, 175 (1995), 197-226
- with F. Pacard: Linear and Nonlinear Aspects of Vortices. Birkhäuser 2000
- "Conservation laws for conformally invariant variational problems". Inventiones Math., 168 (2007), 1-22
- with R. Hardt: "Connecting rational homotopy type singularities of maps between manifolds". Acta Mathematica, 200 (2008), 15-83
- "Analysis Aspects of Willmore Surfaces". Inventiones Math., 174 (2008), no. 1, 1-45
- with G. Tian: "The singular set of 1-1 Integral currents". Annals of Mathematics, 169 (2009), no. 3, 741-794
- with Y. Bernard: "Energy Quantization for Willmore Surfaces and Applications". Annals of Mathematics, 180 (2014), no. 1, 87-136
- "A viscosity method in the min-max theory of minimal surfaces". Publications mathématiques de l'IHÉS, 126 (2017), no. 1, 177-246
