= Stampacchia Medal =

The Stampacchia Gold Medal is an international prize awarded every three years by the Italian Mathematical Union (Unione Matematica Italiana – UMI {it}) together with the Ettore Majorana Foundation (Erice), in recognition of outstanding contributions to the field of Calculus of Variations and related applications. The medal, named after the Italian mathematician Guido Stampacchia, goes to a mathematician whose age does not exceed 35.

== Prize winners ==
- 2003 Tristan Rivière (ETH Zürich)
- 2006 Giuseppe Mingione (University of Parma)
- 2009 Camillo De Lellis (University of Zurich)
- 2012 Ovidiu Savin (Columbia University)
- 2015 Alessio Figalli (The University of Texas at Austin)
- 2018 Guido De Philippis (International School for Advanced Studies)
- 2021 Xavier Ros-Oton (ICREA and Universitat de Barcelona)
- 2024 Maria Colombo (École Polytechnique Fédérale de Lausanne)

== See also ==
- List of mathematics awards
