= Guido De Philippis =

Italian mathematician (born 1985)

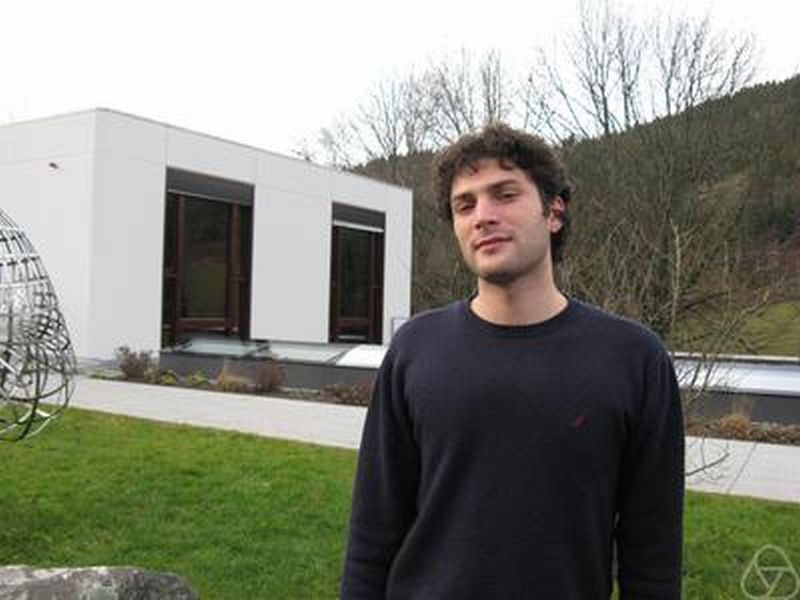
- De Philippis at Oberwolfach, 2011
- Born: August 16, 1985 (age 41); Fiesole, Italy
- Education: Scuola Normale Superiore di Pisa
- Awards: EMS Prize (2016); Stampacchia Medal (2018); Caccioppoli Prize (2022)
- Scientific career
- Fields: Mathematics
- Workplaces: École normale supérieure de Lyon; International School for Advanced Studies; New York University; Università degli Studi di Padova
- Doctoral advisor: Luigi Ambrosio; Luis Caffarelli

Guido De Philippis (born August 16, 1985 at Fiesole) is an Italian mathematician. He works on the calculus of variations, partial differential equations and geometric measure theory.

In 2016, he was awarded the EMS Prize, "for his outstanding contributions to the regularity of solutions of Monge–Ampère equation and optimal maps and for his deep work on quantitative stability inequalities for the first eigenvalue of the Laplacian and rigidity in some isoperimetric type inequalities.". In 2018 he was awarded the Stampacchia Medal. In 2021, he received the ISAAC award.

De Philippis was a PhD student of Luigi Ambrosio and Luis Caffarelli.

== Selected publications ==
- De Philippis, Guido; Figalli, Alessio (May 16, 2014). "The Monge–Ampère equation and its link to optimal transportation". Bulletin of the American Mathematical Society. 51 (4). American Mathematical Society (AMS): 527–580. arXiv:1310.6167. doi:10.1090/s0273-0979-2014-01459-4. ISSN 0273-0979. S2CID 4655511.
- De Philippis, G.; Figalli, A. (2014). "Partial Regularity Results in Optimal Transportation". Trends in Contemporary Mathematics. Cham: Springer International Publishing. doi:10.1007/978-3-319-05254-0_21. ISBN 978-3-319-05253-3. ISSN 2281-518X.
- De Philippis, Guido; Rindler, Filip (November 1, 2016). "On the structure of \mathscr A-free measures and applications". Annals of Mathematics. 184 (3): 1017–1039. arXiv:1601.06543. doi:10.4007/annals.2016.184.3.10. ISSN 0003-486X. S2CID 67844397.
- Regularity of optimal transport maps and applications, Ed. della Normale, Springer 2013 (Dissertation)
