= Camillo De Lellis =

Italian mathematician

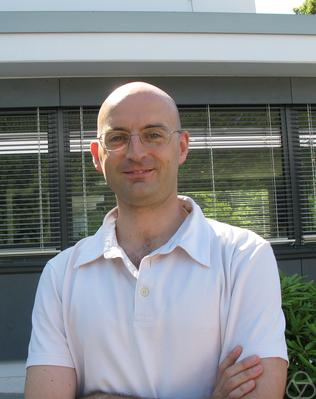
- De Lellis in Oberwolfach 2010
- Born: 11 June 1976 (age 50); San Benedetto del Tronto, Italy
- Education: Scuola Normale Superiore
- Awards: Stampacchia Medal (2009), Fermat Prize (2013), Caccioppoli Prize (2014), Maryam Mirzakhani Prize in Mathematics (2022), Shaw Prize in Mathematical Sciences (2026)
- Scientific career
- Fields: Mathematics
- Workplaces: Institute for Advanced Study; Gran Sasso Science Institute; University of Zurich; Max Planck Institute for Mathematics in the Sciences
- Doctoral advisor: Luigi Ambrosio

Camillo De Lellis (born 11 June 1976) is an Italian mathematician who is active in the fields of calculus of variations, hyperbolic systems of conservation laws, geometric measure theory and fluid dynamics. He is a permanent faculty member in the School of Mathematics at the Institute for Advanced Study. He's a faculty member of the Mathematics area at the Gran Sasso Science Institute. He was also one of the two managing editors of Inventiones Mathematicae.

== Biography ==
Prior joining the faculty of the Institute for Advanced Study, De Lellis was a professor of mathematics at the University of Zurich from 2004 to 2018. Before this, he was a postdoctoral researcher at ETH Zurich and at the Max Planck Institute for Mathematics in the Sciences. He received his PhD in mathematics from the Scuola Normale Superiore at Pisa, under the guidance of Luigi Ambrosio in 2002.

== Scientific activity ==
De Lellis has given a number of remarkable contributions in different fields related to partial differential equations. In geometric measure theory he has been interested in the study of regularity and singularities of minimising hypersurfaces, pursuing a program aimed at disclosing new aspects of the theory started by Almgren in his "Big regularity paper". There Almgren proved his famous regularity theorem asserting that the singular set of an m-dimensional mass-minimizing surface has dimension at most m − 2. De Lellis has also worked on various aspects of the theory of hyperbolic systems of conservation laws and of incompressible fluid dynamics. In particular, together with László Székelyhidi Jr., he has introduced the use of convex integration methods and differential inclusions to analyse non-uniqueness issues for weak solutions to the Euler equation.

== Recognition ==
De Lellis has been awarded the Stampacchia Medal in 2009, the Fermat Prize in 2013 and the Caccioppoli Prize in 2014. He has been invited speaker at the International Congress of Mathematicians in 2010 and plenary speaker at the European Congress of Mathematics in 2012. In 2012 he has also been awarded a European Research Council grant. In 2020 he has been awarded the Bôcher Memorial Prize. In 2021 he became a member of the German Academy of Sciences Leopoldina. He has also been included in the list of invited plenary speakers of the 2022 International Congress of Mathematicians, in Saint Petersburg. In 2022, he was awarded the Maryam Mirzakhani Prize in Mathematics from the NAS. In 2026, he was awarded the Shaw Prize in mathematical sciences.
