= Haïm Brezis =

French mathematician (1944–2024)

- Brezis in 1999
- Born: 1 June 1944; Riom-ès-Montagnes, German-occupied France
- Died: 7 July 2024 (aged 80); Jerusalem
- Citizenship: French
- Education: University of Paris
- Known for: Brezis–Gallouet inequality Brezis–Lieb lemma Bony-Brezis theorem
- Awards: Leroy P. Steele Prize (2024); Euler Lecture (1997); Eugene Catalan Prize (1990); Ampère Prize (1985); ICM Speaker (1974); Peccot Lectures (1973/1974)
- Scientific career
- Fields: Mathematics
- Workplaces: Pierre and Marie Curie University
- Doctoral advisor: Gustave Choquet; Jacques-Louis Lions
- Doctoral students: Abbas Bahri; Henri Berestycki; Jean-Michel Coron; Jesús Ildefonso Díaz; Pierre-Louis Lions; Michelle Schatzman; Juan Luis Vázquez Suárez

Haïm Brezis (1 June 1944 – 7 July 2024) was a French mathematician, who mainly worked in functional analysis and partial differential equations.

== Biography ==
Born in Riom-ès-Montagnes, Cantal, France. Brezis was the son of a Romanian immigrant father, who had come to France in the 1930s, and a Jewish mother who had fled from the Netherlands. His wife, Michal Govrin, is an Israeli novelist, poet, and theater director. Brezis received his Ph.D. from the University of Paris in 1972 under the supervision of Gustave Choquet. He was a professor at the Pierre and Marie Curie University and a visiting distinguished professor at Rutgers University. He was a member of the Academia Europaea (1988) and a foreign associate of the United States National Academy of Sciences (2003). In 2012 he became a fellow of the American Mathematical Society. He held honorary doctorates from several universities including National Technical University of Athens. Brezis is listed as an ISI highly cited researcher. He also served on the Mathematical Sciences jury for the Infosys Prize in 2013 and 2014. In 2024 he was awarded the Leroy P. Steele Prize for Lifetime Achievement of the AMS.

Brezis died in Jerusalem on 7 July 2024, at the age of 80.

== Works ==
- Opérateurs maximaux monotones et semi-groupes de contractions dans les espaces de Hilbert (1973)
- Analyse Fonctionnelle. Théorie et Applications (1983)
- Haïm Brezis. Un mathématicien juif. Entretien Avec Jacques Vauthier. Collection Scientifiques & Croyants. Editions Beauchesne, 1999. ISBN 978-2-7010-1335-0, ISBN 2-7010-1335-6
- Functional Analysis, Sobolev Spaces and Partial Differential Equations, Springer; 1st Edition. edition (10 November 2010), ISBN 978-0-387-70913-0, ISBN 0-387-70913-4

== See also ==
- Differential inclusion
- Gagliardo–Nirenberg interpolation inequality
