= Catellani reaction =

Chemical reaction

The Catellani reaction was discovered by Marta Catellani (Università degli Studi di Parma, Italy) and co-workers in 1997. The reaction uses aryl iodides to perform bi- or tri-functionalization, including C-H functionalization of the unsubstituted ortho position(s), followed a terminating cross-coupling reaction at the ipso position. This cross-coupling cascade reaction depends on the ortho-directing transient mediator, norbornene.

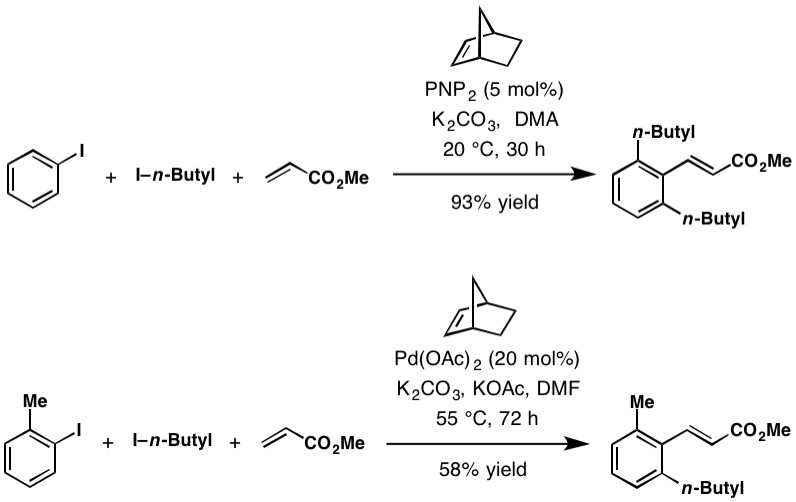
Original and general reaction conditions for the Catellani reaction. PNP_{2} = cis,exo-2-phenylnorbornyl palladium chloride dimer

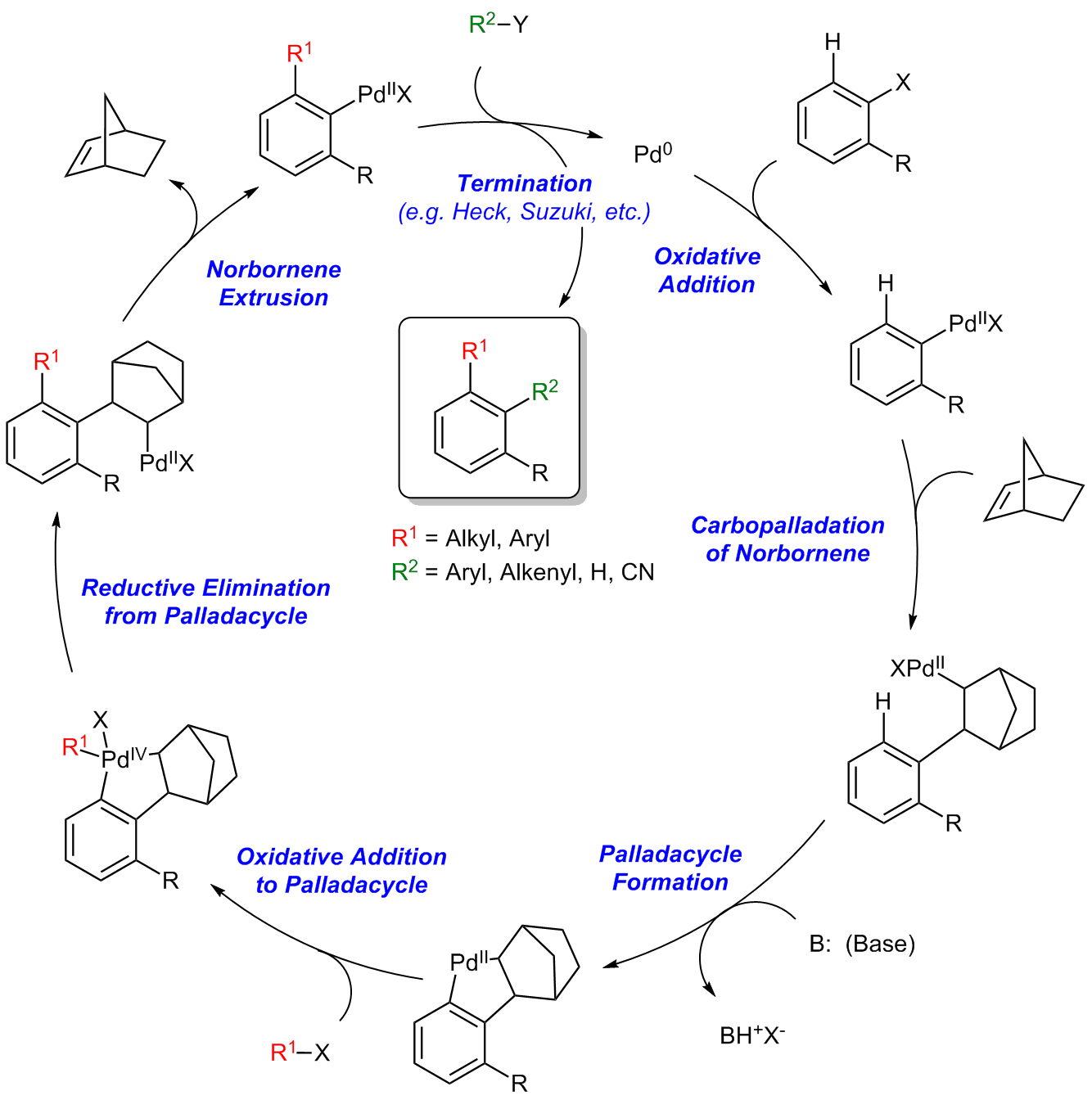
Catalytic cycle of the Catellani reaction. (Ligands and stereochemistry are omitted for clarity.)

== Reaction mechanism ==
The Catellani reaction is catalyzed by palladium and norbornene, although in most cases superstoichiometric amounts of norbornene are used to allow the reaction to proceed at a reasonable rate. The generally accepted reaction mechanism, as outlined below, is intricate and believed to proceed via a series of Pd(0), Pd(II), and Pd(IV) intermediates, although an alternative bimetallic mechanism that avoids the formation of Pd(IV) has also been suggested.

Initially, Pd(0) oxidatively adds into the C–X bond of the aryl halide. Subsequently, the arylpalladium(II) species undergoes carbopalladation with the norbornene. The structure of the norbornylpalladium intermediate does not allow for β-hydride elimination at either of the β-positions due to Bredt's Rule for the bridgehead β-hydrogen and the trans-configuration between palladium and other β-hydrogen. Thereafter, the Pd(II) species undergoes electrophilic cyclopalladation at the ortho position of the aryl group. Subsequently, the palladacyclic intermediate undergoes a second oxidation addition with the alkyl halide coupling partner to form a Pd(IV) intermediate, which undergoes reductive elimination to forge the first C–C bond of the product. After β-carbon elimination of norbornene, the resultant Pd(II) species then undergoes a second C–C bond forming step via a Heck reaction or cross coupling with an organoboron reagent to afford the final organic product and close the catalytic cycle.

Steps of the Catellani reaction:

1. Oxidative addition
2. Carbopalladation of norbornene
3. Palladacycle formation
4. Oxidative addition to palladacycle
5. Reductive elimination from palladacycle
6. Norbornene extrusion
7. Termination via Heck reaction, Suzuki reaction, etc.

== Ortho and ipso cross-coupling partners ==
The Catellani reaction facilitates a variety of C—C and C—N bond-forming reactions at the ortho position. These include alkylation from alkyl halides, arylation from aryl bromides, amination from benzyloxyamines, acylation from anhydrides. Likewise in the case of terminating ipso coupling partners with Heck-type termination with olefins, Suzuki-type reaction with boronic esters, borylation with bis(pinacolato)diboron, protonation with i-PrOH, decarboxylative alkynylation with alkynyl carboxylic acids.

== Uses ==
With tethered cross-coupling partners, Lautens, Malacria, and Catellani used this reaction to construct a variety of fused ring systems since 2000. The Catellani reaction has been used as a key step for the total synthesis (+)-linoxepin, rhazinal, aspidospermidine, and (±)-goniomitine.
