= Chayko =

Chayko is a surname. Notable people with the surname include:

- Aleksandr Chayko, Russian military commander
- Belinda Chayko, Australian film director and screenwriter
- Mary Chayko, American sociologist and Distinguished Teaching Professor of Communication and Information at Rutgers University
