= Chiara Valentini =

Italian journalist and essayist (1941–2026)

- Born: 16 July 1941; Parma, Italy
- Died: 7 January 2026 (aged 84); Rome, Italy
- Education: University of Parma
- Occupations: Journalist; Essayist

Chiara Valentini (16 July 1941 – 7 January 2026) was an Italian journalist and essayist.

== Life and career ==
Born in Parma on 16 July 1941, Valentini graduated from the University of Parma with a thesis on honor killings. She began working as a journalist for Corriere della Sera. In 1968, she was selected for a commentary competition by RAI; although she did not place in the competition, it jumpstarted her journalism career. She became a culture editor at Panorama and worked as a biographer and investigative journalist in the 1970s. Following disagreements with the editor-in-chief of Panorama, she joined L'Espresso and became a correspondent in the Soviet Union. In the 1990s, she covered the Bosnian War and wrote a hard-hitting piece on ethnic rape in the conflict. She also wrote biographies for notable Italian figures such as Dario Fo and Enrico Berlinguer. She worked on book projects for Controparola until 2018.

Valentini died in Rome on 7 January 2026, at the age of 84.

== Publications ==
- La storia di Dario Fo (1977)
- Il compagno Berlinguer (1985)
- Berlinguer il segretario (1987)
- Il nom est la cosa. Viaggio nel Pci (1990)
- Le donne fanno paura (2000)
- La fecondazione interditta (2004)
- O i figli o il lavoro (2012)
- Berlinguer (2014)
- Il coraggio delle donne (2020)
- Der eigenartige Genosse Enrico Berlinguer. Kommunist und Demokrat im Nachkriegseuropa (2022)
