= Younes and Soraya Nazarian Library =

Academic library of University of Haifa, Israel

Coordinates: 32.7630571°N 35.0182601°E

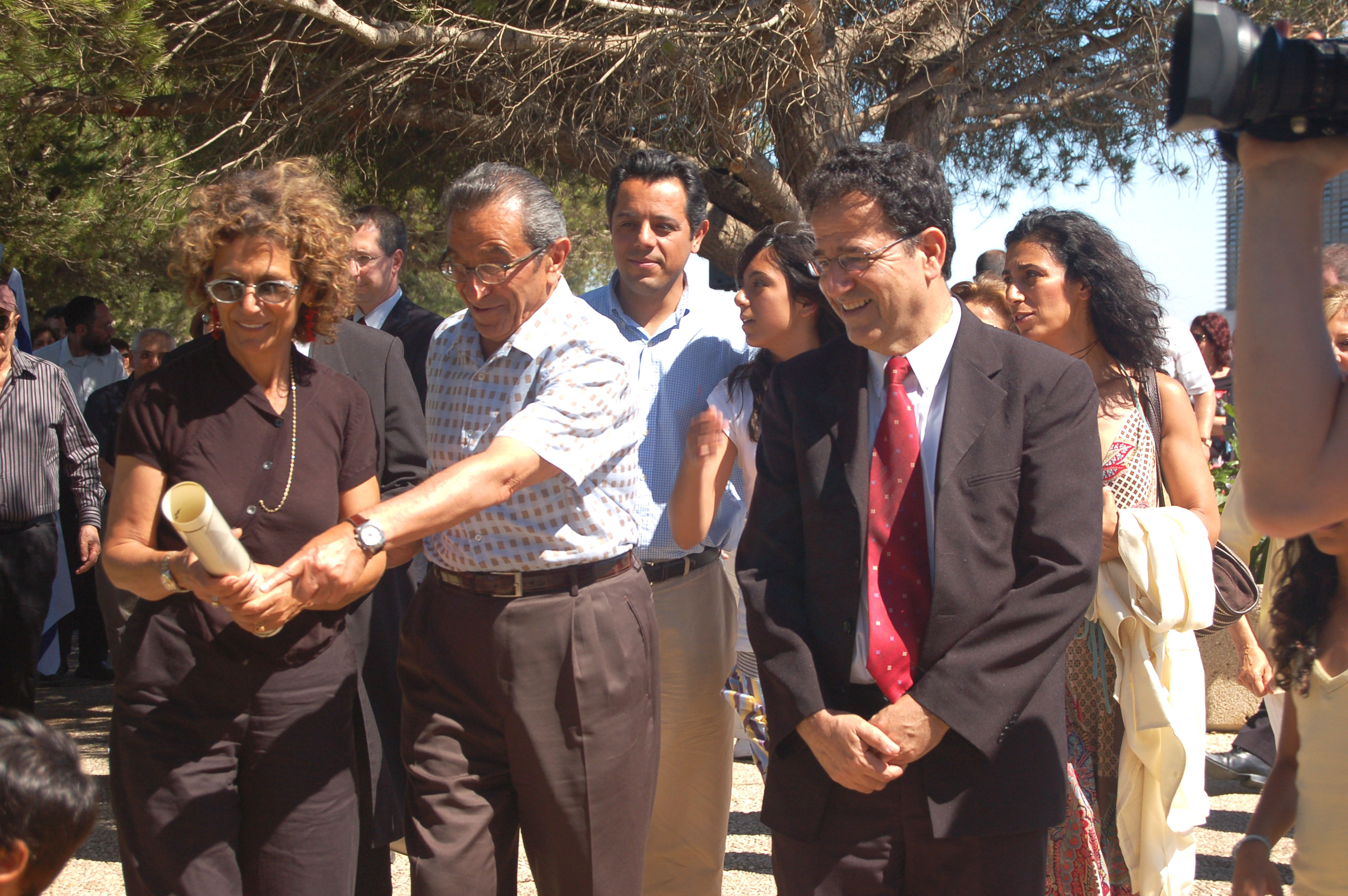
Cornerstone-laying ceremony for the new library wing, July 2007. From left-to-right: Soraya and Younes Nazarian, Aaron Ben-Ze'ev

The Younes and Soraya Nazarian Library is a central academic library of the University of Haifa, and one of the largest in Israel. It is also one of the most progressive Israeli libraries in terms of service, collection, physical space, and library information systems.

Since its founding in 1963, the library has operated under one roof and is managed by a central administration. The library offers academic information expertise for locating the wide range of material in its holdings and accessible via the Internet. The library's role in the university's academic activity is based on professional specialization, which enables provision of information services in a wide variety of disciplines and information types.

The library devotes many resources to the development, preservation and digitization of special collections, such as dissertations, research publications, historical photographs of the Land of Israel, and archives of theatrical and performing arts. The collections, which are displayed under Digital Projects and Archives – Digital Collections, contribute to instruction and research in the university and beyond. Special emphasis is placed on ensuring accessibility in both the short and long term to the academic community and to the general public interested in matters of heritage preservation. An additional distinctive project is the production of the Index to Hebrew Periodicals, a database of Hebrew Language articles and periodicals.

== Collection ==
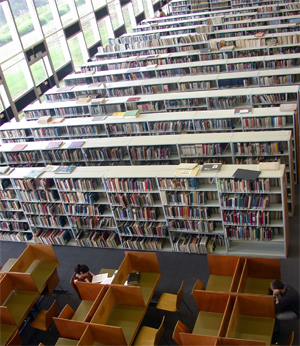
Shelves in the general collection – Younes and Soraya Nazarian Library, University of Haifa

All library items may be searched and retrieved by means of Primo – an Ex Libris Group unified search box in the library web site.

The library collection comprises over two million items, including books and periodicals (in printed and digital formats), online databases in a variety of disciplines, maps and other cartographic material, films, audio recordings, pictures and archival material.

The library's collections include:

- General Collection – Most books are located on the open shelves and may be borrowed for two weeks.
- Reserves Collection – Numbers over 15,000 items, including: books for instructional use transferred to the collection by request of lecturers; a collection of psychological evaluation tests; and lecturers' private books made available for student use. Most items in this collection may be borrowed for three days, some for one night only, and some are for in-house use.
- Periodicals Collection – This collection is divided into Loazi (i.e., non-Hebrew) titles, Hebrew titles and microforms. Periodicals may be borrowed for one week, by University staff members and Ph.D. students only. As of 2011, the Periodicals Collection held over 45,000 titles, including over 20,000 electronic journals.
- Media Collection – Holds audio-visual library materials, such as video, audio, music scores, maps, satellite images, aerial photography, atlases, globes and historical maps. Along with these items are the tools enabling use of non-print material (stereo, video and DVD systems). In addition, there are special collections of books in the fields of art, photography, geography, environmental studies, music, archeology and cartography, as well as relevant printed material accompanying the non-print collections.
- Law Collection – Contains print and electronic materials, including legal literature from Israel and other countries: books, periodicals and legal encyclopedias. There are also reserve books, required readings for courses in the Law Faculty, by request of the lecturers; Israeli and foreign legislation and court decisions; and legal databases.
- Psychological Tests Collection – Contains questionnaires and assessment instruments in a variety of fields, such as psychology, occupational therapy, physiotherapy and learning disorders. To facilitate development of the collection, the library maintains ongoing contact with the various departments that make use of it. In addition, every questionnaire in dissertations – whether original, translated or adapted – is cataloged.
- Dictionaries Collection – Includes dictionaries for many languages, which may be borrowed only for the purpose of examinations.
- Children's Literature Collection – Holds about 22,000 books for leisure and informational reading, some 20,000 in Hebrew and 2000 in Arabic. The books may not be borrowed. Various activities in the areas of information literacy and encouragement of reading take place in the collection, for public-school and special-education pupils. The Subject Index to Children's and Youth Literature, developed by the library, makes it possible to search the collection by topic.
- Rare Books Collection – Contains over 3000 books, including special items that can no longer be purchased, books issued in limited editions, and books that are important due to their binding. Among the items in the rare books collection are works of Judaica, single pages from the Geniza, and Spinoza’s "Theological-Political Treatise," including the author's handwritten notes.
- Aba Khoushy Archive – Holds many documents, lectures, protocols, pictures, and some personal items of Abba Khoushi from the years 1919–1969, which accumulated during his years in Israel as a public figure and party activist, as secretary of the Haifa Workers’ Council and mayor of Haifa from 1951 to 1969.

In addition to the above, varied collections of digital photographs, as well as the Database for Israeli Theater Archives.

== Services ==
As of 2012, some 160 computer stations are available to library visitors for searching and retrieving information. The library's resources are available to the university community from off-campus as well. The library has several helpdesks: Circulation and Interlibrary Loan; Reference; Reserves-Media and Periodicals. All helpdesks are concentrated at the entry level.

Users may also get assistance from the remote reference service, including replies via email and WhatsApp. The library also provides a service for photocopying, scanning, color printing, CD burning and document binding. Within the library building and most of the university there is access to free Wi-Fi.

Admission is free to visitors, including high-school students from 10th grade and up, but there is a charge for assistance with locating materials. Most of the library collections are freely accessible.

== Location and structure ==
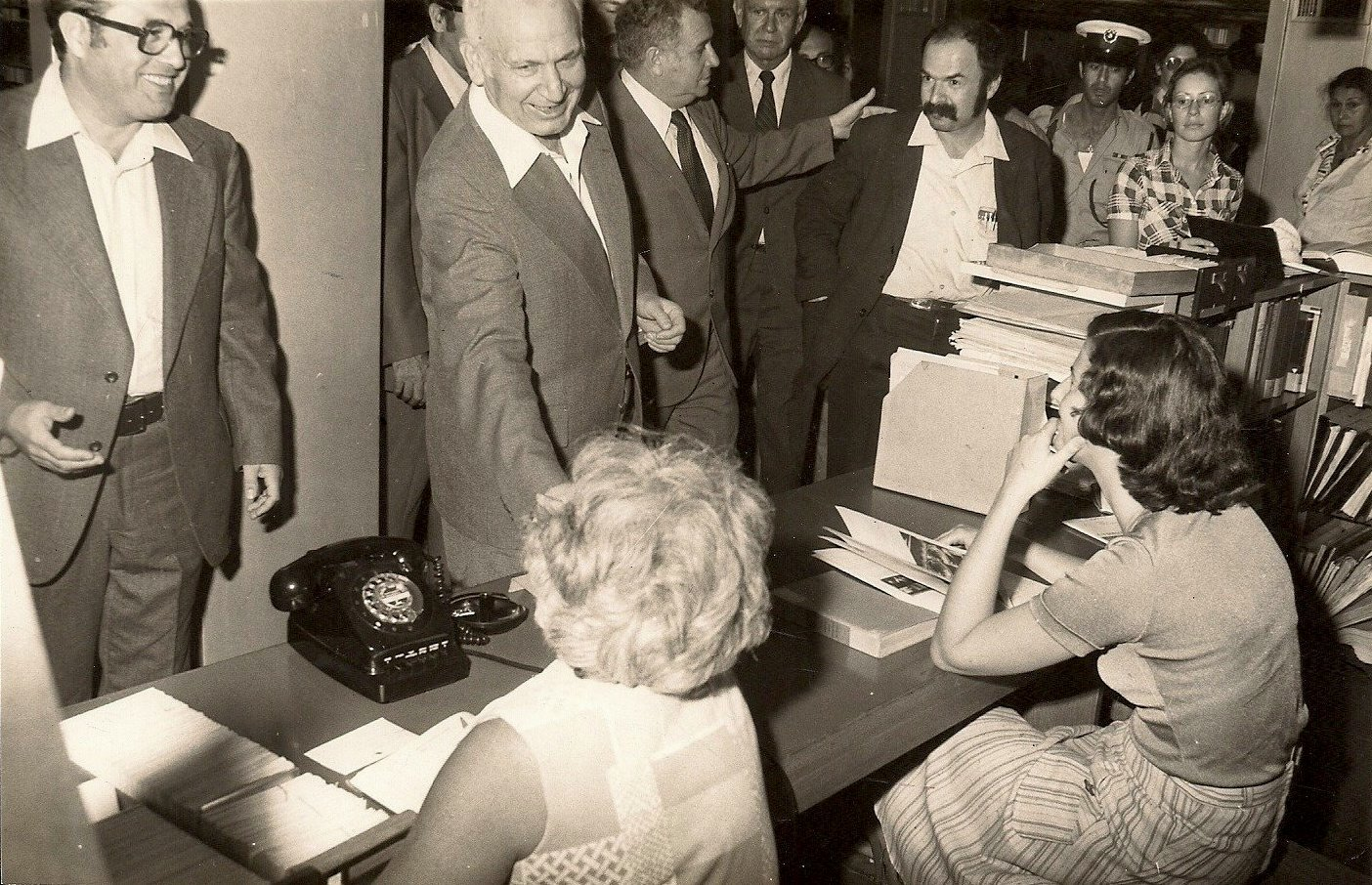
Visit of Ephraim Katzir, fourth President of Israel, to the University of Haifa Library, 15 November 1976. To Katzir's right is Shmuel Sever, Library Director, and to his left Eliezer Refaeli, University President. The librarians are Rina Irmai (left) and Sarah Spiegel (right).

The library's location has changed over the years since it first opened in 1963, in the High School in Edelstein House on Y.L. Peretz Street in the Hadar HaCarmel neighborhood.

In the mid-1960s the library – in the framework of the University Institute of Haifa – moved to a new location in the Haifa city school "Ironi Heh", on Bikurim Street in Hadar HaCarmel. From 1969 until summer 1973 the library was temporarily transferred to the upper floor of the Multi-Purpose Building on the new university campus.

In the early 1970s, construction of the library in its current location commenced, as part of the project for establishing the university, designed by Oscar Niemeyer. In keeping with the architect's conception of a "university under one roof," the library was founded as a central library serving all the faculties, constituting an academic center where people from varied disciplines would interact for mutual enrichment.

Shmuel Sever, the library's director at the time, devoted several months to planning a modern, large library that would serve well into the future. Architect Shlomo Gilad translated his concepts and vision into architectural plans. Oscar Niemeyer designed the building in which the library is located in the style of "Brutalistic architecture," characterized by building with bare concrete in both simple and compound forms to create broad, open spaces that facilitate interior division and future expansion. This approach was common between the 1950s and mid-1980s, due to the influence of Le Corbusier.

The planning and construction work continued several years, and as luck would have it, concluded just at the unexpected outbreak of the Yom Kippur War. Despite the constraints and the lack of male workers for putting up shelves, maintenance and carrying loads, Shmuel Sever requested that the library move to its new quarters as scheduled. And in fact, after detailed planning and despite the severe shortage of workers, librarians and books alike were transferred to the new location. Readers could now make use of a large, high-ceilinged reading room (which was said to be, at the time, the largest in the Middle East), whose eastern façade was composed entirely of windows facing onto the splendid view of Haifa Bay. The reading room itself held tens of work tables and chairs, the angle of whose backrests had been selected from several models by a poll of readers.

The books themselves were housed in galleries on the library's four levels. Broad corridors, stretching from east to west in the building, ensured maximal illumination. An explicit order from architect Gilad forbade closing these corridors, lest the daylight be blocked. New, brown carpets added warmth to the library, and wood paneling on shelves and walls softened their grayish color.

It seemed, at the time, that the bookshelves would last forever, that the library had no boundaries, and was destined to serve its patrons for many years. In fact, the library that Niemeyer designed fulfilled its purpose for over thirty years. But at the beginning of the 21st century, the library found itself too small and outdated to accommodate its growing collections and the advanced services and technologies it provided. It was not equipped to respond to changing research and teaching needs and its patrons' expectations of an inviting, friendly environment.

Baruch Kipnis, director of the library from 2001 to 2005, initiated the idea of expanding and renovating the library according to the planning principles that he set forth and the architectural program that he prepared along with the library staff. His persuasive efforts succeeded in obtaining the agreement of the university's administration to support the idea of expansion and renovation.

In 2002, an architectural competition took place based on the principles and program that had been formulated. Architect Asaf Lerman was selected to carry out the planning and supervise the construction of a new wing. The project of erecting the building received impetus following receipt of a generous donation from the Nazarian family [see below]. Library director Oren Weinberg oversaw the construction work until its completion.

Lerman selected fashionable materials such as bare concrete, glass and wood, and planned the new wing in a neo-modernistic spirit, creating a successful dialog with the old wing built in the modernistic style of Niemeyer. Construction was completed in 2010. For his planning of the new wing, architect Lerman was selected as one of five finalists for the 2010 Rechter Prize in architecture.

Renovation of the original library wing, including reorganization of the library entrance, interior spaces, study corners, a central service area and circulation desks, was completed in June 2012.

== Expansion, 2007–2012 ==
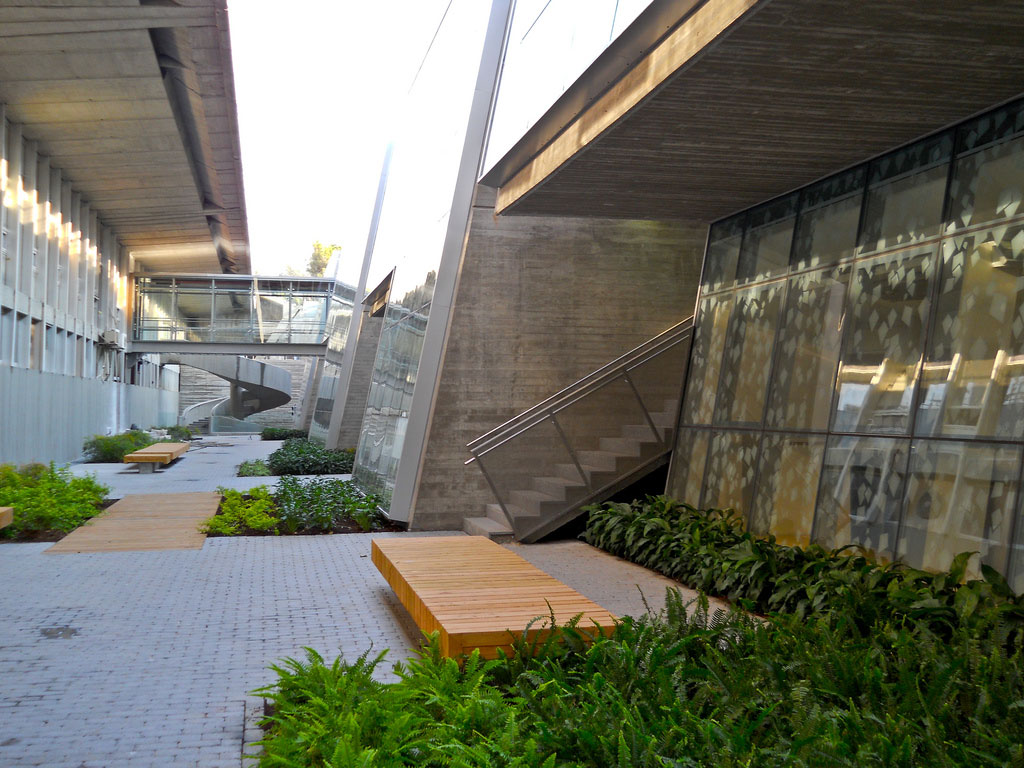
Entrance and patio, south wing 2012.

In 2007, Soraya and Younes Nazarian, leading members of the community of expatriate Iranian Jews in Los Angeles, made a generous donation to the university for the purpose of renovating and expanding the library, including construction of a new wing.

The Nazarians are known for their philanthropic activities on behalf of the community in a variety of fields, including the arts, health and the development of institutions of higher education in the United States and Israel. The couple donates to educational institutions in Israel out of a conviction that education is essential for Israel's future. They believe that investment in education will improve not only the personal condition of each citizen, but also the economic situation of the whole nation.

In June 2007, Younes Nazarian received an honorary doctorate during the meeting of the university's Board of Governors, in recognition of his donation and commitment to the State of Israel and to Jews the world over.

The dedication ceremony for the new wing, officially named the Southern Wing, took place on 31 May 2011, at which time the library was renamed the Younes and Soraya Nazarian Library, University of Haifa. On 3 June 2012, during the 40th annual meeting of the university's Board of Governors and in the presence of the donors, an additional festive dedication ceremony was held to mark the conclusion of the library renovation.

== Technological development ==
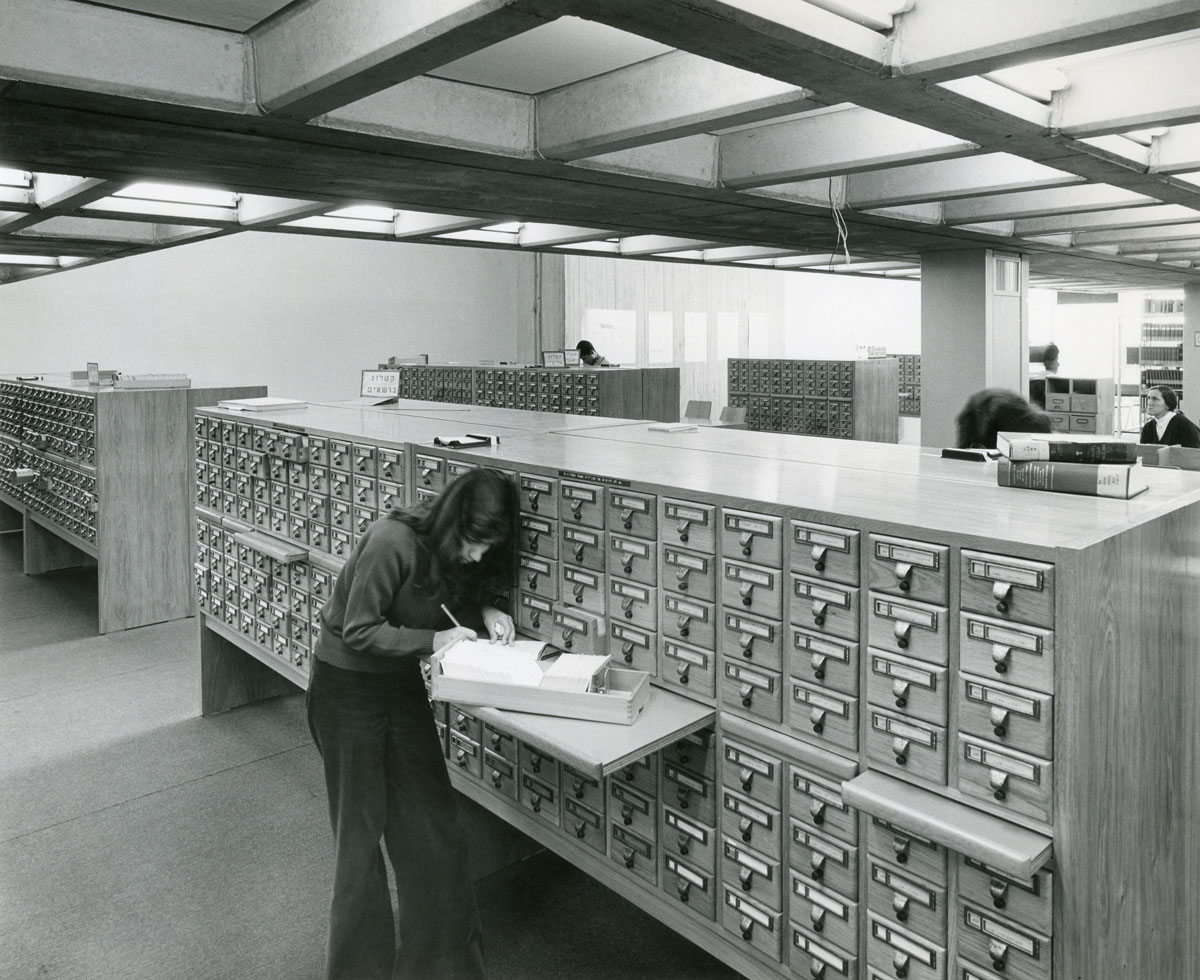
Traditional card catalog

From the time the library opened in the early 1960s, it has developed in keeping with changes in the technological environment. A central change was the transition from use of the Dewey Decimal classification system to that of the Library of Congress, which was at the time unknown in Israel. This transition was led by Elhanan Adler and Aviva Shichor Additional milestones were the computer revolution that the library underwent from the end of the 1970s and the introduction of the Internet at the beginning of the 1990s.

Technological developments influenced the means of storing information, the library catalog and databases on the one hand, and retrieval of information, on the other. The many transformations in the professional work of librarians and information specialists and in the use of the library and its resources included remote access to the library catalog and bibliographic databases, electronic periodicals and books, and remote reference services (by means of telephone, email and WhatsApp).

The influence of technological advancement is evident throughout the library. The traditional card catalog was replaced in the 1980s by a computerized catalog, which itself evolved over years and became accessible via the Internet. Access to many databases was transformed from a local CD network to online formats. Most periodicals were converted to digital format, accessible from anywhere at any time. Collections of slides, photographs and products of university research were scanned and merged into the Digital Media Center. Over time, electronic books constitute an ever-larger proportion of the library's collection.

A unique project of the library is the Index to Hebrew Periodicals, a multi-disciplinary tool that provides users access to academic articles as well as business and popular ones. The Index contains citations to hundreds of thousands of articles from selected periodicals, collections and daily newspapers in many fields: Judaica, literature, education, history, archeology, the arts, architecture, medicine, law, agriculture, nature, science, technology, society and the nation. Since its inception in 1977, the indexing project was transformed over the years from a printed format to a computerized one, and was eventually incorporated into the library services available via the Internet.

Since 2009 the library's online services were unified under the OneSearch portal – based on the Primo system – which provides a single entry point to all the library's resources. The library was the first in Israel to adopt Primo and to develop and integrate the Hebrew interface (including graphic design and text display), based on usability testing.

== Library assessment activities ==
Since 2007, the library has regularly carried out library assessment activities aimed at determining the quality of its services based on user feedback via satisfaction surveys, wayfinding, usability and focus groups. These surveys examined: the physical environment, services, user needs, the collection, and user interfaces both within the library and via remote access.

Once every three years the library conducts a LibQUAL user satisfaction survey. LibQUAL, established and managed by the Association of Research Libraries (ARL) in the United States, is an international survey that has been carried out in more than 1000 academic libraries worldwide. The University of Haifa Library is the first Israeli library to participate, and assisted in developing the Hebrew version of the survey.

The library maintains a dedicated website that publicizes all the assessment activities, the results of surveys, and actions taken by the library in light of the results.

== Library directors and years of service ==
- Moshe Yogenstein – 1963–1969
- Shmuel Sever – 1969–2000
- Baruch Kipnis (z"l) – 2000–2005
- Oren Weinberg – 2005–2011, Academic directors: Prof. Chaya Bar-Yitzchak, Prof. Yaakov Barnai, Prof.Yoav Gelber
- Pnina Erez – 2011–2018, Academic director: Prof. Yossi Ziegler
- Naomi Greidinger – 2018–, Academic director: Prof. Dafna Erdinest-Vulcan, Prof. Daphne Raban

== Photo gallery ==
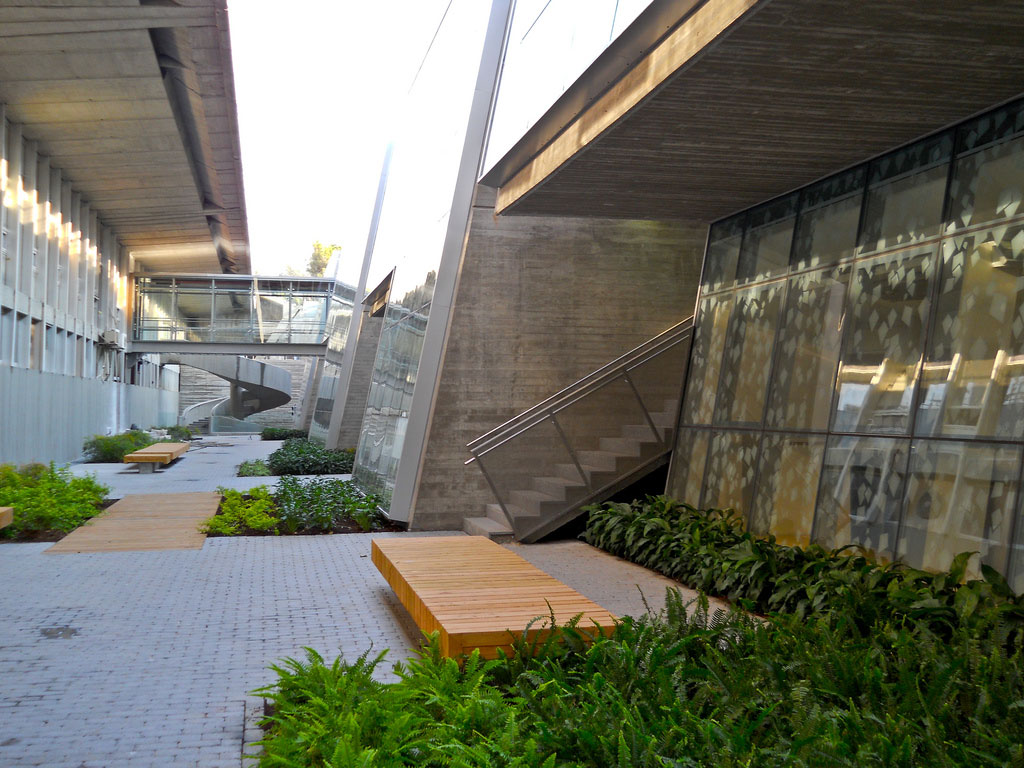
Entrance and patio, south wing

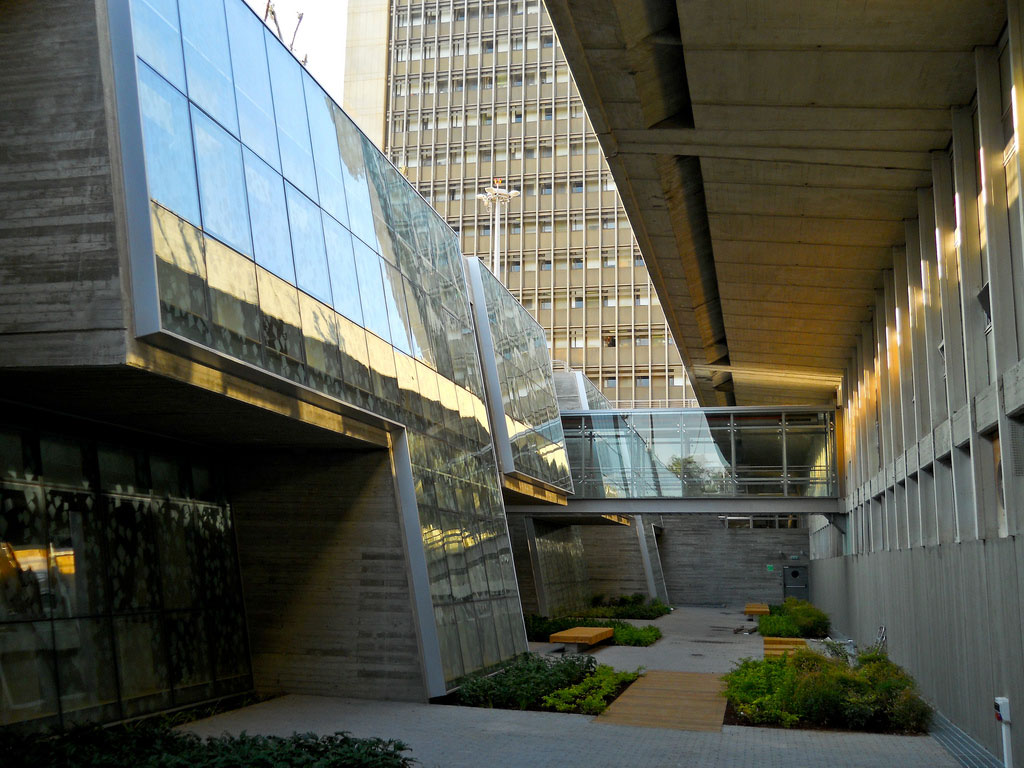
Windows of the original library facing the new wing. In the background: Eshkol Tower

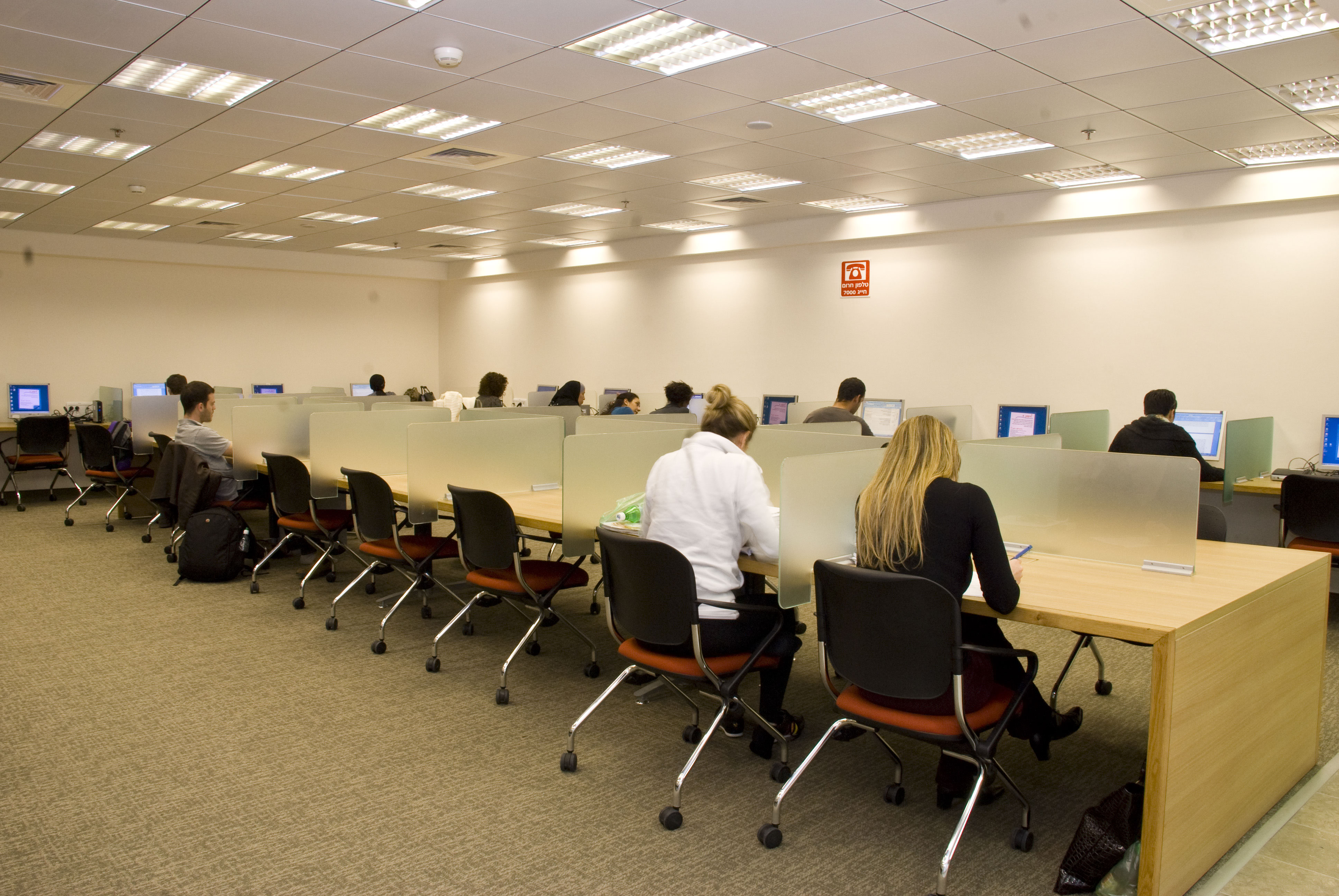
Reading room, lower level of the south wing

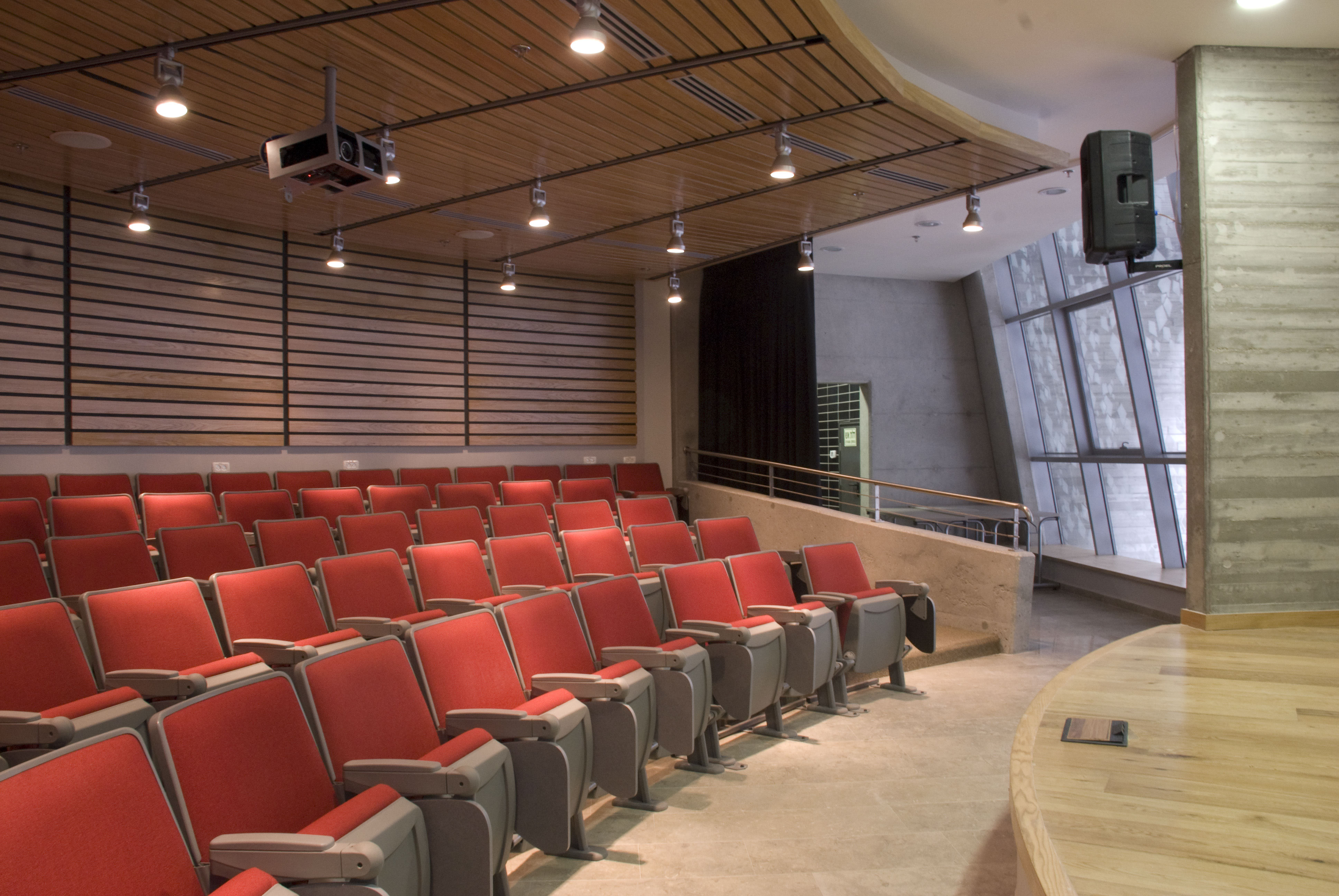
Library auditorium, first level of the south wing

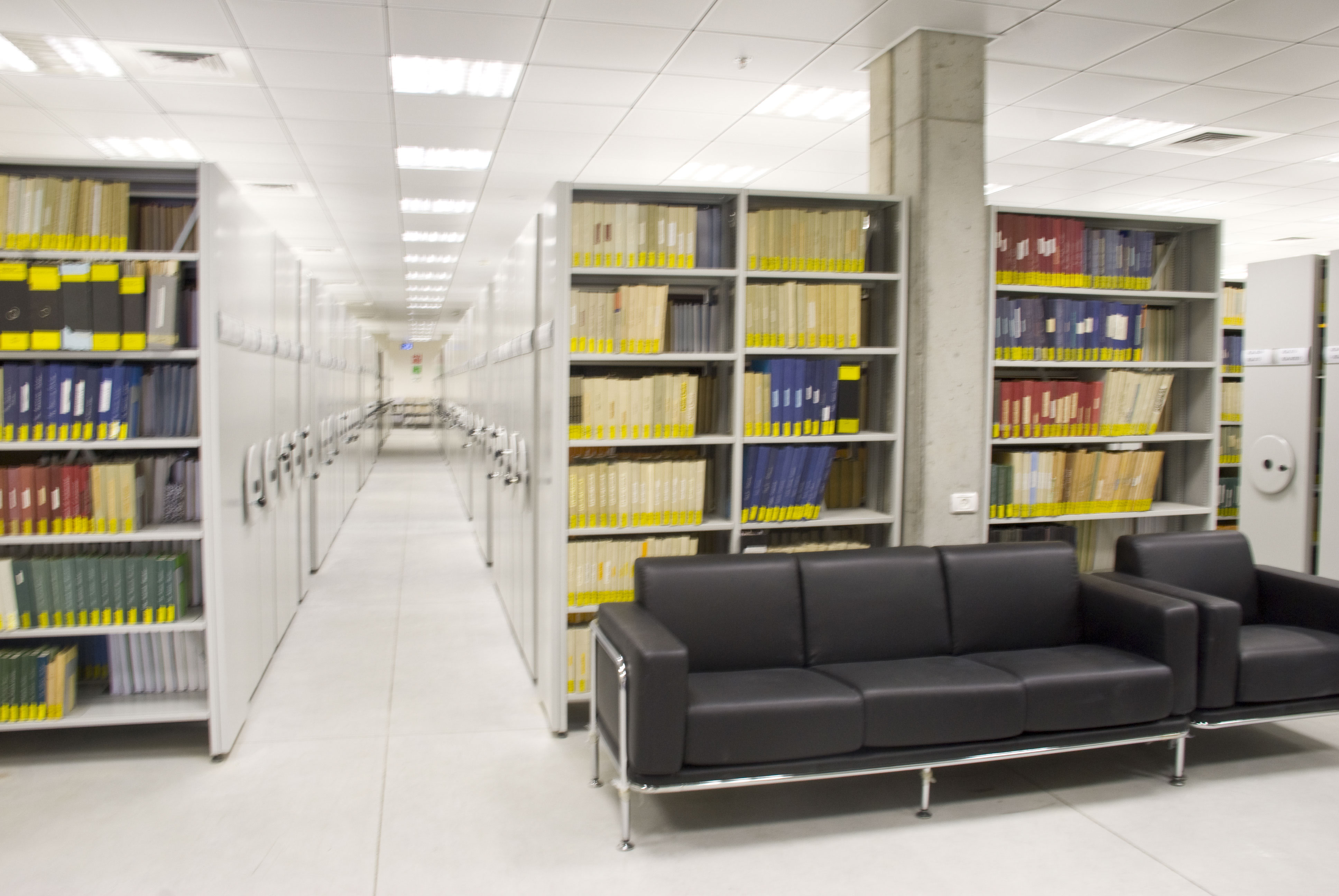
Collection of non-Hebrew periodicals, lower level of the south wing
