= Superconnected =

Superconnected may refer to:

- "Superconnected", a song by Broken Social Scene from Broken Social Scene
- "Super-Connected", a song by Belly from King
- Superconnected: The Internet, Digital Media and Techno-Social Life, a book by Mary Chayko
- Superconnectivity, a concept in graph theory
