= Piero Mozzi =

Italian doctor (1950)

- Born: Pietro Mozzi; 30 January 1950 (age 76); Bobbio, Italy
- Citizenship: Italian
- Education: University of Parma
- Known for: Founder of Mogliazze Community
- Scientific career
- Fields: Naturopathy, Medicine

Piero Mozzi (born 30 January 1950) is an Italian doctor and naturopath. He graduated at University of Parma, and in the 1990s he founded the Mogliazze Biological Community.

He is a convinced theorist of the blood type diet.

== Publications ==
- La nuova dieta del dottor Mozzi
- Si può guarire
- Le ricette del dottor Mozzi
- COVID-19 e patologie virali
- Doctor Mozzi's New Diet
