= Library assessment =

Library assessment is a process undertaken by libraries to learn about the needs of users (and non-users) and to evaluate how well they support these needs, in order to improve library facilities, services and resources. In many libraries successful library assessment is dependent on the existence of a 'culture of assessment' in the library whose goal is to involve the entire library staff in the assessment process and to improve customer service.

Although most academic libraries have collected data on the size and use of their collections for decades, it is only since the late 1990s that many have embarked on a systematic process of assessment (see sample workplans) by surveying their users as well as their collections. Today, many academic libraries have created the position of Library Assessment Manager in order to coordinate and oversee their assessment activities. In addition, many libraries publish on their web sites the improvements that were implemented following their surveys as a way of demonstrating accountability to survey participants.

Several libraries have undertaken renovation or expansion projects as a result of their assessment activities as well as enhance resource discovery tools, improve web site usability and stop redundant services.

== Tools ==
In order to determine what is important to library users and how satisfied they are with services, resources and physical space, library assessment utilizes a variety of research methods such as: website usability testing, observation, 'In-Library Use' surveys, focus groups, interviews, wayfinding, balanced scorecard, furniture usability, photo and mapping surveys, organizational climate, statistics and satisfaction surveys. The most widely used library satisfaction survey is LibQUAL+, a service quality evaluation survey developed by the Association of Research Libraries (ARL) based on ServQUAL. Other satisfaction surveys are: the SCONUL Satisfaction Survey, Insync Surveys (formerly Rodski), and Counting Opinions LibSat survey.

== USA, UK, Australia and Israel ==
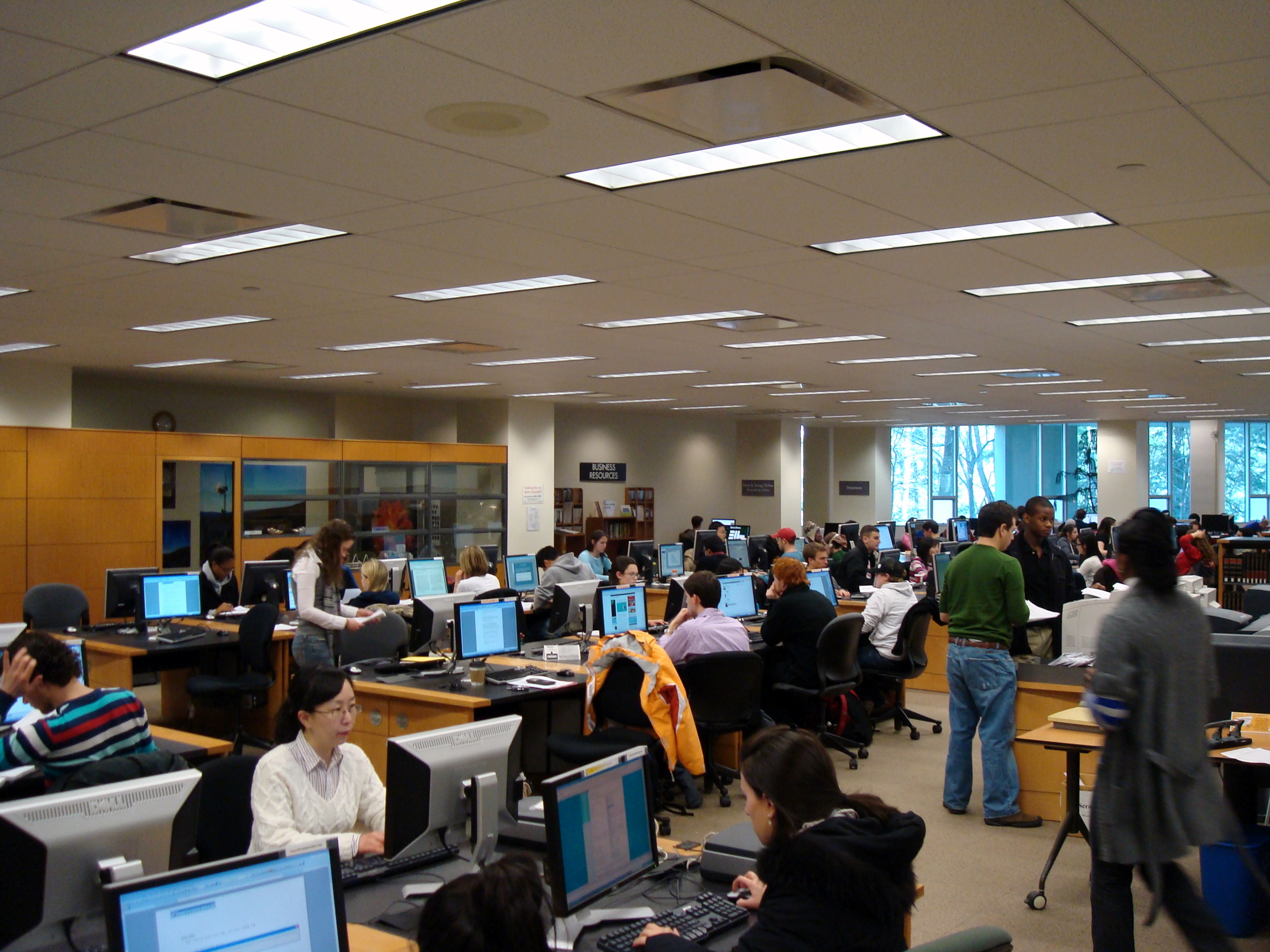
Cornell University Mann Library

Although library assessment has become almost ubiquitous in the United States, Australia, UK and some European countries such as Italy and Denmark since 2000, it is still relatively uncommon elsewhere. Below are a selection of library assessment sites that show the multitude of activities undertaken by assessment teams: University of Washington, USA; University of Virginia, USA; University of York, England, Council of Australian University Libraries (CAUL).

One notable exception is Israel whose University of Haifa Younes and Soraya Nazarian Library began a systematic process of library assessment in 2007, and has been conducting a Hebrew version of the University of Washington's 'In-Library Use' survey since 2008, and LibQUAL+ Lite (also in Hebrew) since 2009 in three-yearly cycles.

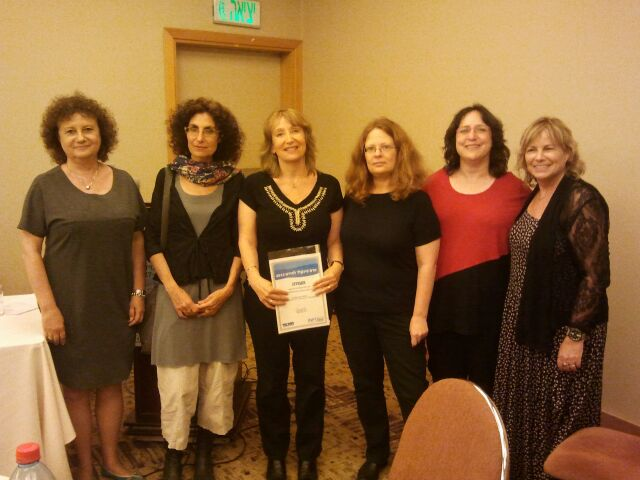
University of Haifa, Library Assessment Team receiving the Finkler Prize for Information, 2012

== Conferences ==
The library assessment community holds two biennial conferences: the Library Assessment Conference (LAC) in USA and the Library Performance Measurement Conference (LibPMC), formerly the Northumbria Performance Measurement Conference which is generally held in Europe. Also relevant are the annual Qualitative and Quantitative Methods in Libraries Conference (QQML) and the annual Evidence Based Library and Information Practice Conference (EBLIP).

== Courses ==
Although courses on library assessment are not commonplace on the curricula of library schools, in the past few years several schools have opened courses, such as: the University of North Carolina at Chapel Hill School of Information and Library Science and the joint Digital Library Program of Oslo and Akershus University College of Applied Sciences, Norway, Tallinn University, Estonia, and the University of Parma, Italy.
