= Marta Catellani =

Italian chemist

- Education: University of Parma
- Known for: The Catellani reaction
- Scientific career
- Institutions: University of Parma, University of Chicago, Moscow State University, Beijing Institute of Technology, University of Xi'an

Marta Catellani is an Italian chemist known for her discovery of the eponymous Catellani reaction in 1997. She was elected to the European Academy of Sciences in 2016.

Catellani completed her postdoctoral education at the University of Chicago. She has served as a visiting professor at Moscow State University (1992), Beijing Institute of Technology (2004), and University of Xi'an (2004). She was awarded a fellowship at the Japan Society for the Promotion of Science in 2012.

Her research focuses on palladium as a catalyst for multistep organic reactions.

== The Catellani Reaction ==
Catellani and her team in 1997 found a method, known as the Catellani Reaction, for creation of carbon-carbon bonds. which are useful in construction of more complex compounds.

The Catellani Reaction has opened the door to other discoveries or improvements in chemistry. Specifically in the world of pharmaceuticals, it has been useful for synthesizing drugs more efficiently to aid in their development. Lenoxipen is an example of one of the complex compounds now much easier to achieve with the discovery of Catellani Reactions. This compound belongs to a group of compounds known as Lignans that are useful for relieving pain and may provide benefits to cancer patients.
