= Aaron Ben-Ze'ev =

Israeli philosopher

- אהרון בן-זאב
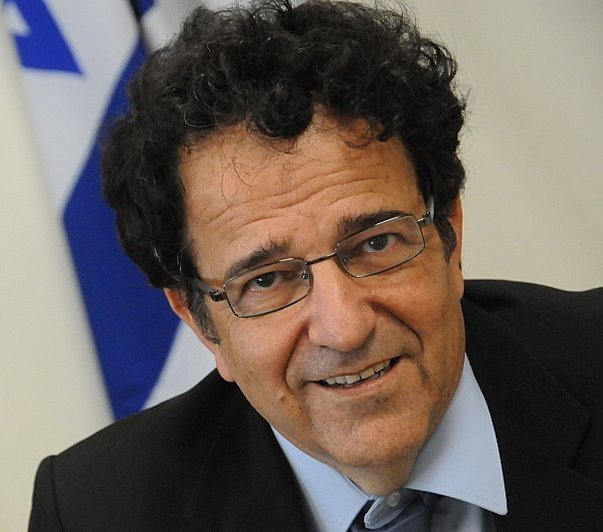
- Born: July 30, 1949 (age 76); Israel

Education
- Education: University of Haifa (B.A. in Philosophy and Economics, 1975; M.A. in Philosophy, 1977); University of Chicago (Ph.D., 1981)

Aaron Ben-Ze'ev (Hebrew: אהרון בן-זאב; born 30 July 1949) is an Israeli philosopher. He was President of the University of Haifa from 2004 to 2012.

== Biography ==
Aaron Ben-Ze'ev and his two older brothers Yehuda and Avinoam were born to Israel and Haika (Weinkrantz) Ben-Ze'ev and were raised on kibbutz Ein Carmel. When Aaron was 18, his eldest brother Yehuda, 32, was killed in the Six-Day War. Aaron is married to Ruth, with whom he has two sons, Dean and Adam.

Ben-Ze'ev received his B.A. in Philosophy and Economics (1975) and his M.A. in Philosophy (1977), both from the University of Haifa. He was awarded his Ph.D. from the University of Chicago (1981). His doctoral thesis was entitled "Perception as a Cognitive System." Michael Strauss (his M.A. thesis advisor) and Stephen Toulmin influenced his philosophical views. Their thinking is marked by a broad outlook on profound issues of philosophy, analysis and application to everyday issues. Ben Ze'ev's views on epistemology and perception are influenced by Immanuel Kant, and his views on the mind-body relationship and emotions hark back to Aristotle and Spinoza.

== Academic career ==
Ben-Ze'ev has held several academic positions at the University of Haifa, including: President (2004–2012); Rector (2000–2004); Dean of Research (1995-2000); Philosophy Department Chairperson (1986–1988); Chairperson of the Humanity Division, Oranim-School of Education (1991–1994); Chairperson of the Association of Universities' Heads of Israel; Head of the University of Haifa Press; and Head of the Academic Channel. He established the Interdisciplinary Center for the Study of Emotions at the University of Haifa. He is currently the President of the newly established European Philosophical Society for the Study of Emotions.

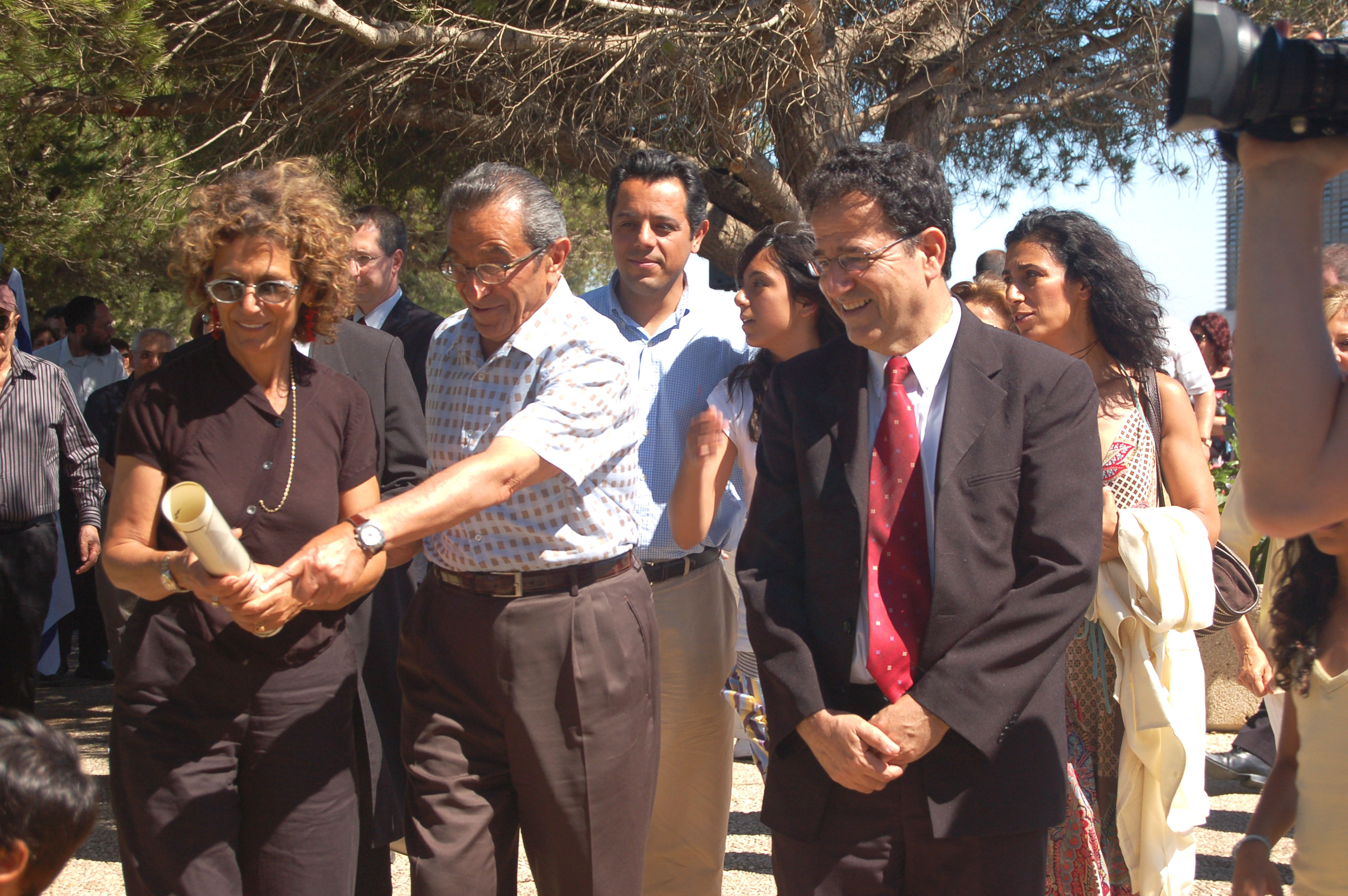
Cornerstone-laying ceremony for the new Library wing of University of Haifa, July 2007. From left-to-right: Soraya and Younes Nazarian, Prof. Aaron Ben-Ze'ev.

In his various writings on perception (in particular, The Perceptual System), Ben-Ze'ev rejects the indirect view of perception and argues for the presence of direct, non-pure perception. He rejects naïve realism as well as extreme subjectivism, and argues for a critical realism. Such realism considers perceptual qualities as properties of the perceptual environment, which is a relational environment that presupposes the existence of a perceiver. Within the perceptual environment, perception is direct, as it involves direct awareness of events in the environment, but in light of the relational nature of this environment, perceptual awareness merely provides partial information about the world—that part which is influenced by the subject’s characteristics. In his view, perception is direct in two major senses: it is perception of the objects themselves, not of internal mental representations, and it is not preceded by mediating inferential processes. Ben-Ze'ev's book The Perceptual System received an excellent review in The Review of Metaphysics, with the reviewer, Jack Onstein, stating that Ben-Ze'ev's view is “the only remotely plausible approach” to the mind–body problem: “Finally, we have a theory of perception and the mind which any scientifically-minded, critical philosopher can live with.” Together with his work on perception, Ben-Ze'ev has pursued related issues in the philosophy of psychology, such as the body–mind problem and memory, and has written on various philosophers, in particular Aristotle and Thomas Reid.

Five years after finishing his Ph.D. thesis, Ben-Ze'ev began to study the emotions, a topic that remains at the center of his research today. In this field he was particularly influenced by Aristotle (mainly his analysis of emotions as evaluative attitudes) and by Spinoza (in particular, his emphasis on the importance of change in generating emotions). The psychological work that has most influenced his thinking has been The Cognitive Structure of Emotions (1988) by Ortony, Clore and Collins. Ben-Ze'ev has published many articles in this field, as well as several books: The Subtlety of Emotions (MIT 2000), Love Online: Emotions on the Internet (Cambridge 2004)), In the Name of Love: Romantic Ideology and its Victims (Oxford: 2008; written with Ruhama Goussinsky), and Die Logik der Gefühle: Kritik der emotionalen Intelligenz (Suhrkamp, 2009).

== Published works ==
Ben-Ze'ev's major books are The Perceptual System (Peter Lang, 1993); The Subtlety of Emotions (MIT UP, 2000); Love Online: Emotions on the Internet (Cambridge UP, 2004); In The Name of Love: Romantic Ideology and its Victims (with Ruhama Goussinsky, Oxford UP, 2008); Die Logik der Gefühle: Kritik der emotionalen Intelligenz (Suhrkamp, 2009); and The Arc of Love: How Our Romantic Lives Change over Time (University of Chicago Press, 2019).
