= Aspidospermidine =

Names
- IUPAC name (3aR,10bR)-3aβ-Ethyl-2,3,3a,4,5,5aα,6,11,12,13aβ-decahydro-1H-indolizino[8,1-cd]carbazole

Identifiers
CAS Number	2912-09-6
3D model (JSmol)	Interactive image
ChEBI	CHEBI:38486
ChemSpider	5256809
PubChem CID	6857472
UNII	38EV97NHY2
- InChI: InChI=1S/C19H26N2/c1-2-18-9-5-12-21-13-11-19(17(18)21)14-6-3-4-7-15(14)20-16(19)8-10-18/h3-4,6-7,16-17,20H,2,5,8-13H2,1H3/t16-,17-,18-,19-/m1/s1 Key: YAAIPCQYJYPITK-NCXUSEDFSA-N; InChI=1/C19H26N2/c1-2-18-9-5-12-21-13-11-19(17(18)21)14-6-3-4-7-15(14)20-16(19)8-10-18/h3-4,6-7,16-17,20H,2,5,8-13H2,1H3/t16-,17-,18-,19-/m1/s1 Key: YAAIPCQYJYPITK-NCXUSEDFBY
- SMILES: CC[C@]12CCCN3[C@H]1[C@]4(CC3)c5ccccc5N[C@@H]4CC2

Properties
Chemical formula	C_{19}H_{26}N_{2}
Molar mass	282.431 g·mol^{−1}
- Except where otherwise noted, data are given for materials in their standard state (at 25 °C [77 °F], 100 kPa). Infobox references

Aspidospermidine is an alkaloid isolated from plants in the genus Aspidosperma. It has been a popular target for total synthesis, due in part to the fact that it provides a good showcase for synthetic strategies but also because the structure is similar to many other important bioactive molecules.
