= Academic library =

Library attached to a higher education institution

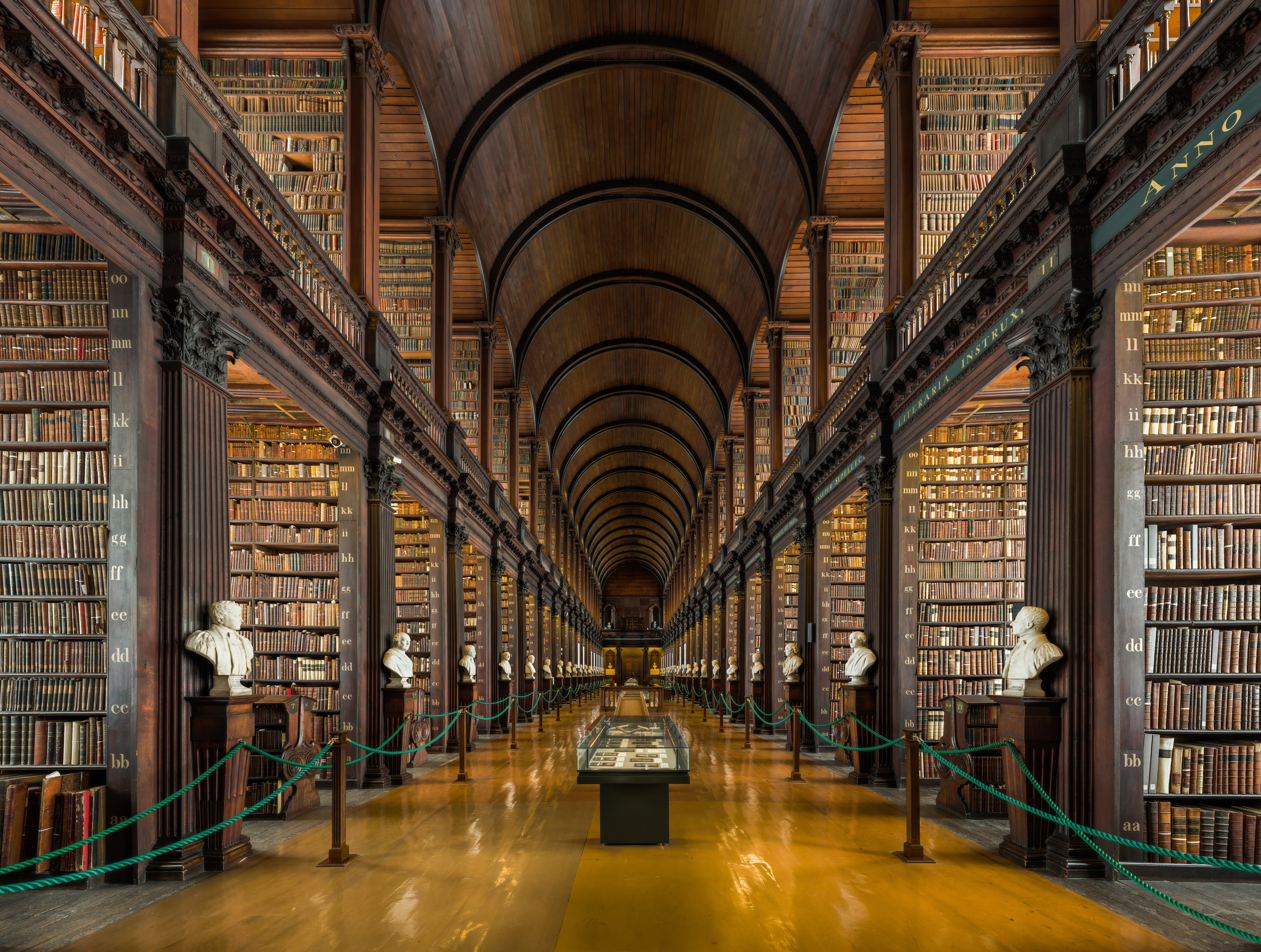
The Library of Trinity College Dublin, established in 1592

An academic library is a library that is attached to a higher education institution, which supports the curriculum and the research of the university faculty and students. According to the National Center for Education Statistics, there are an estimated 3,700 academic libraries in the United States. Class reading materials, intended to supplement lectures by the instructor and housed in academic libraries, have historically been known as "reserves". Before electronic resources became available, the reserves were supplied as actual books or as photocopies of appropriate journal articles. Modern academic libraries provide access to electronic resources.

Academic libraries must determine a focus for collection development since comprehensive collections are not feasible. Librarians do this by identifying the needs of the faculty, student body, the mission and academic programs of the college or university. When there are particular areas of specialization in academic libraries, these are often referred to as niche collections. These collections are often the basis of a special collection department and they may include original papers, manuscripts, artwork, and artifacts written or created by a single author or about a specific subject.

There is a great deal of variation among academic libraries based on their size, resources, collections, and services. The Harvard Library, which houses over 20 million volumes, is the largest strictly academic library in the world, although the Danish Royal Library—a combined national and academic library—has a larger collection at about 37 million volumes. The University of California operates the largest academic library system in the world, managing about 41 million volumes across 100 libraries on ten campuses. Another notable example is the University of the South Pacific which has academic libraries distributed throughout its twelve member countries.

== History ==
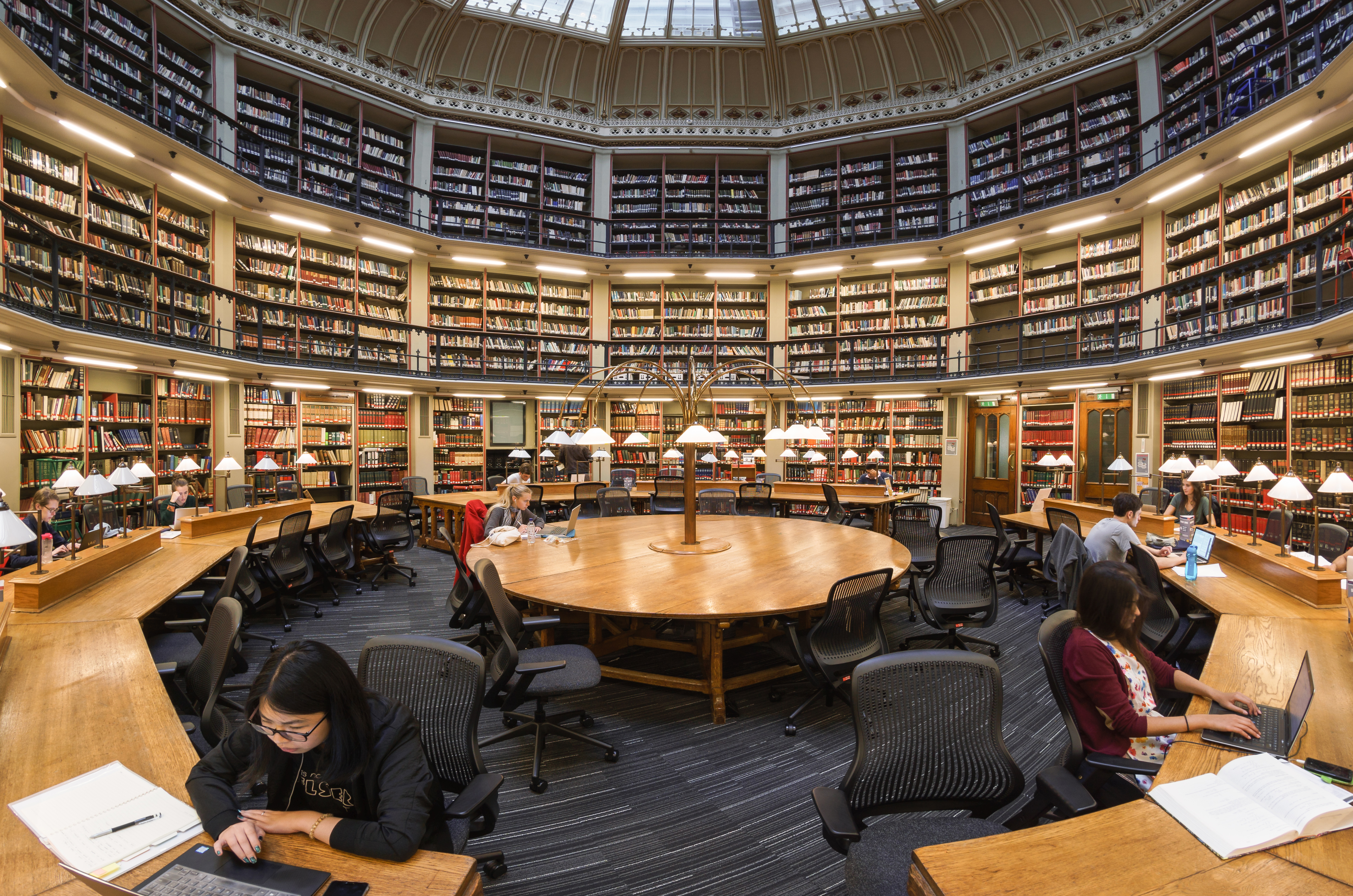
The Round Reading Room at Maughan Library, the main academic library of King's College London

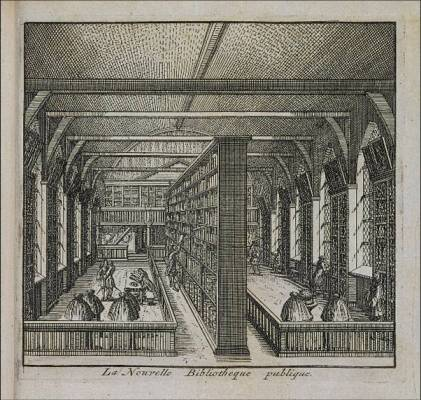
University Library Leiden in the Netherlands, founded in 1694

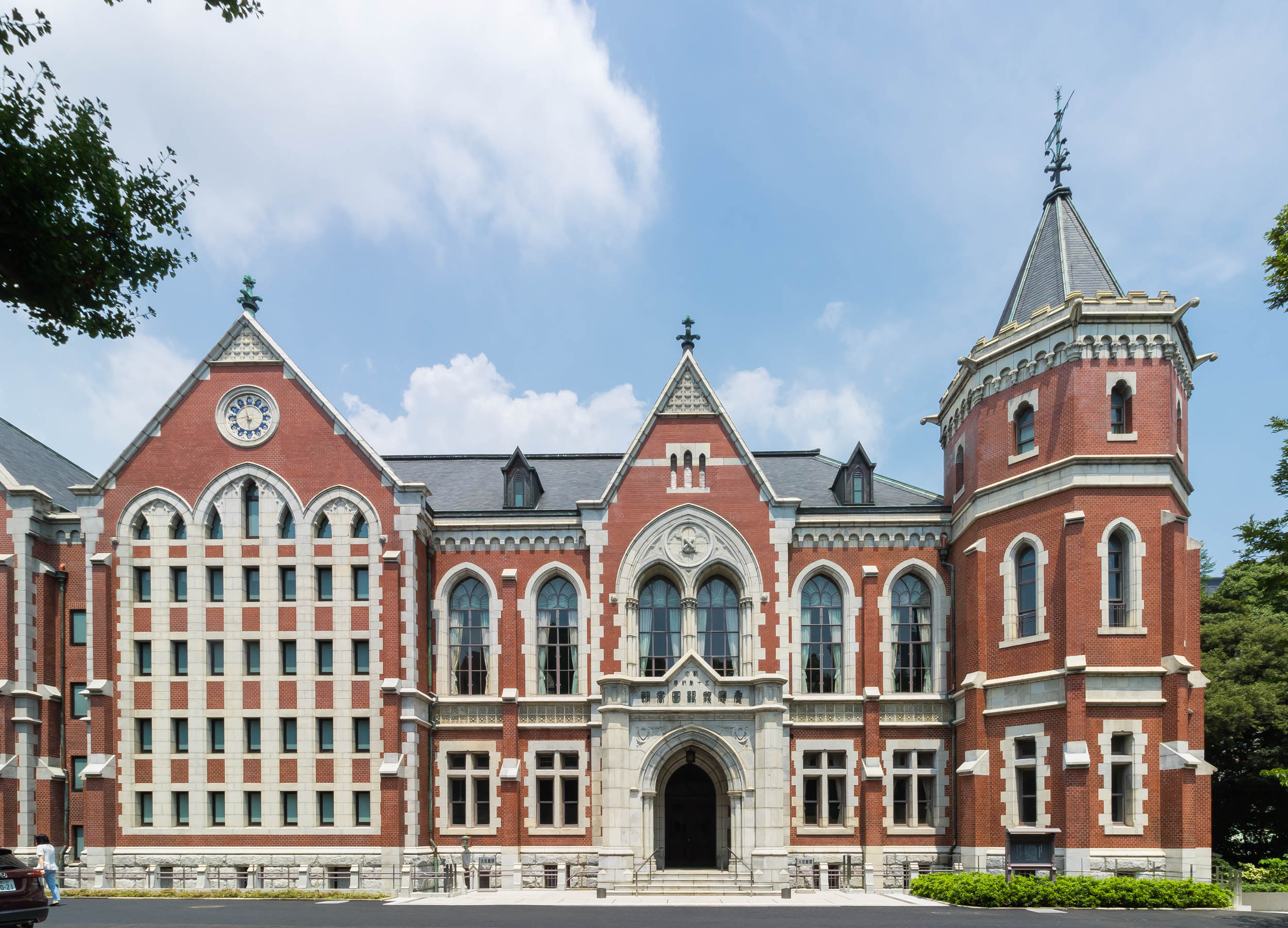
The Old Library at Keio University in Tokyo

Libraries date back to the ancient world. The earliest academic libraries include the Library of Alexandria and the library at Nalanda University, which apparently burned for months because of the sheer number of manuscripts.

== States ==
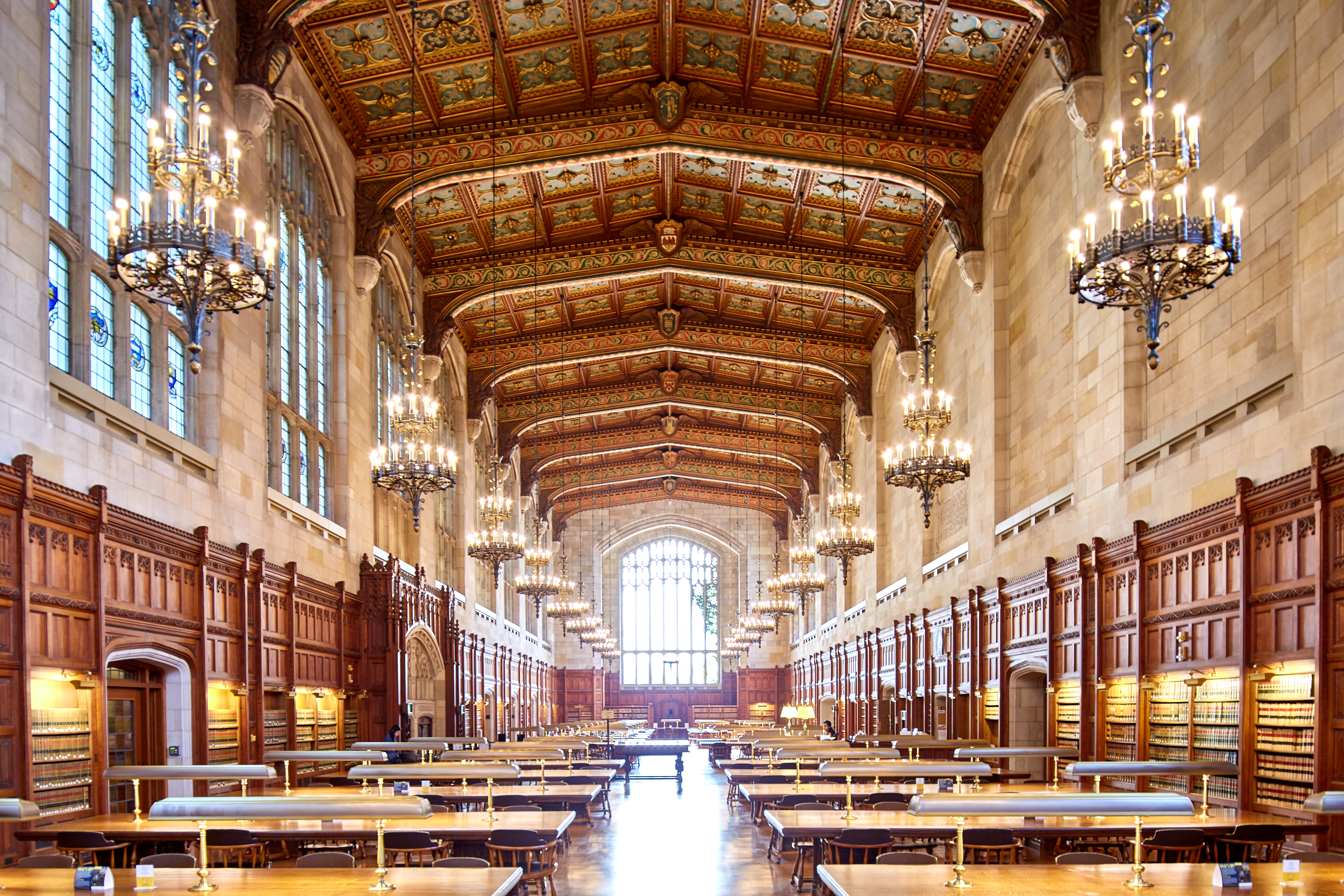
The Law Library at the University of Michigan in Ann Arbor, Michigan

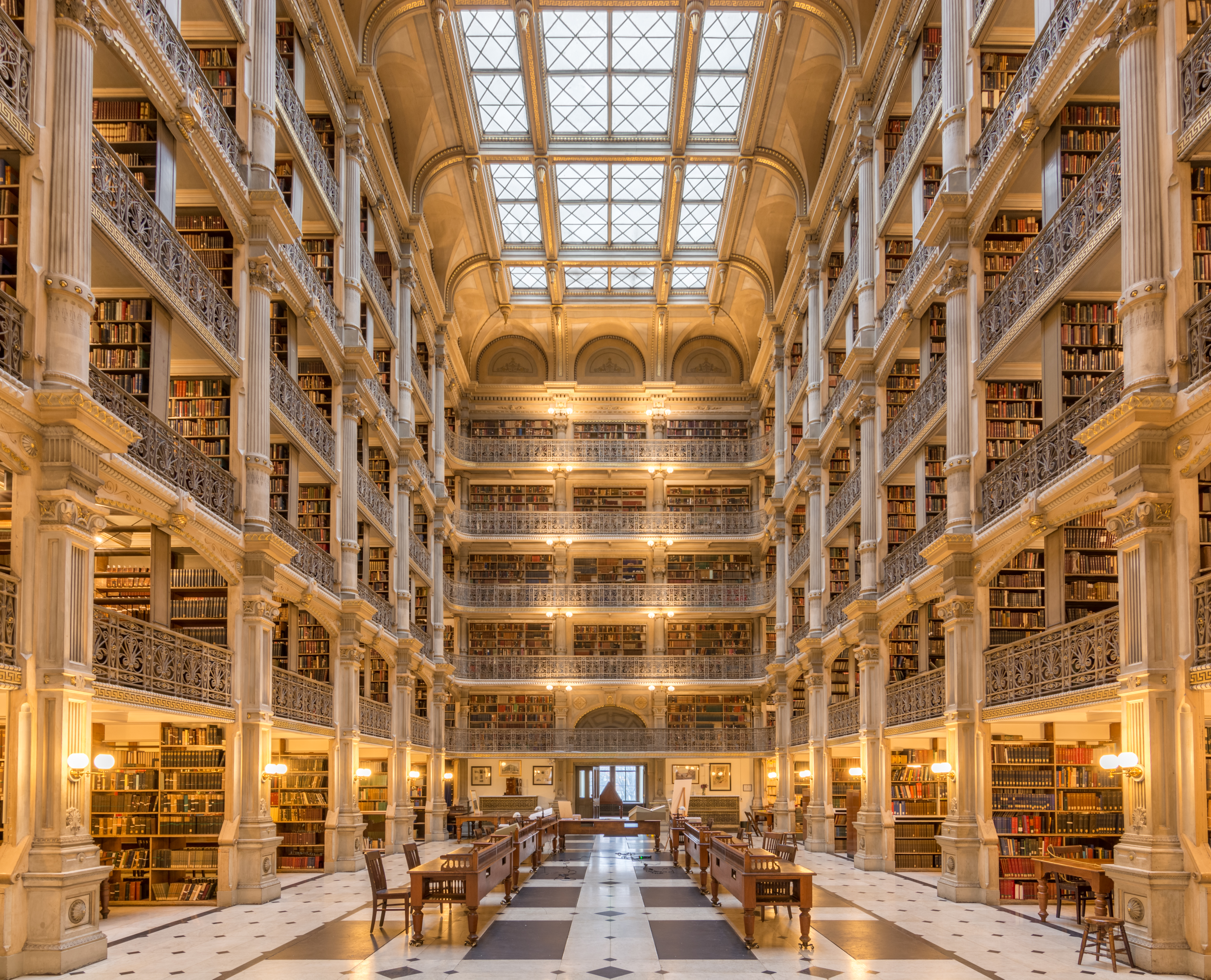
George Peabody Library at Johns Hopkins University in Baltimore

The first colleges in the United States were largely intended to train clergy members. The libraries associated with these institutions largely consisted of donated books on the subjects of theology and the classics. In 1766, Harvard University had the most volumes held followed by Yale University, which had 4,000 volumes. Access to these libraries was restricted to faculty members and a few students: the only staff was a part-time faculty member or the president of the college. The priority of the library was to protect the books, not to allow patrons to use them. In 1849, Yale was open 30 hours a week, the University of Virginia was open nine hours a week, Columbia University four, and Bowdoin College only three. Students instead created literary societies and assessed entrance fees for building a small collection of usable volumes, often over what the university library held.

In 1876, the American Library Association (ALA) was formed with members including Melvil Dewey and Charles Ammi Cutter. Libraries re-prioritized to improve access to materials and found funding increasing due to increased demand for said materials.

In 1904, the Bibliographical Society of America was founded to foster the study of books and manuscripts. Academic librarians were the majority of members.

Academic libraries today vary regarding the extent to which they accommodate those not affiliated with their parent universities. Some offer reading and borrowing privileges to members of the public on payment of an annual fee; such fees can vary greatly. The benefits usually do not extend to such services as computer usage other than to search the catalog or Internet access. Alumni and students of cooperating local universities may be given discounts or other considerations when arranging for borrowing privileges. On the other hand, some universities' libraries are restricted to students, faculty, and staff. Even in this case, they may make it possible for others to borrow materials through interlibrary loan programs.

Libraries of land-grant universities generally are more accessible to the public. In some cases, they are official government document repositories and are required to be open to the public. Still, public members are generally charged fees for borrowing privileges and usually are not allowed to access everything they would be able to as students.

Harvard Library at Harvard University, a private Ivy League university in Cambridge, Massachusetts, is the largest academic library in the world with over 20 million volumes, 400 million manuscripts, 10 million photographs, and one million maps.

=== Canada ===
In Canada, academic libraries have been more recently developed than in other nations. The first academic library in Canada, opened in 1789, was in Windsor, Nova Scotia, at the University of King's College. Academic libraries were significantly small during the 19th century and up until the 1950s, when Canadian academic libraries began to grow steadily as a result of greater importance being placed on education and research.

In the 1960s, academic libraries in Canada began to grow as a direct result of larger student enrollments, increased graduate programs, higher budget allowance, and general advocacy of the importance of these libraries. As a result of this growth and the Ontario New Universities Library Project that occurred during the early 1960s, five new universities were established in Ontario that all included fully cataloged collections. The establishment of libraries was widespread throughout Canada and was furthered by grants provided by the Canada Council and the Social Sciences and Humanities Research Council, which sought to enhance library collections. Since many academic libraries were constructed after World War II, a majority of the Canadian academic libraries that were built before 1940 that had not been updated to modern lighting, air conditioning, etc., are either no longer in use or are on the verge of decline. The total number of college and university libraries increased from 31 in 1959–1960 to 105 in 1969–1970.

Following the growth of academic libraries in Canada during the 1960s, there was a brief period of sedation, which directly resulted from some significant budgetary issues. These academic libraries were faced with cost issues relating to the recently developed service of interlibrary lending and the high costs of periodicals on acquisition budgets, which affected overall acquisition budgeting and ultimately public collections. Canadian academic libraries faced consistent problems relating to insufficient supplies and an overall lack of coordination among collections.

Academic libraries within Canada might not have flourished or continued to be strengthened without the help of outside organizations. The Ontario Council of University Libraries (OCUL) was established in 1967 to promote unity among Canadian academic libraries. The Ontario College and University Library Association (OCULA) is attached to the Ontario Library Association (OLA) and is concerned with representing academic librarians regarding issues shared in the academic library setting.

=== Europe ===
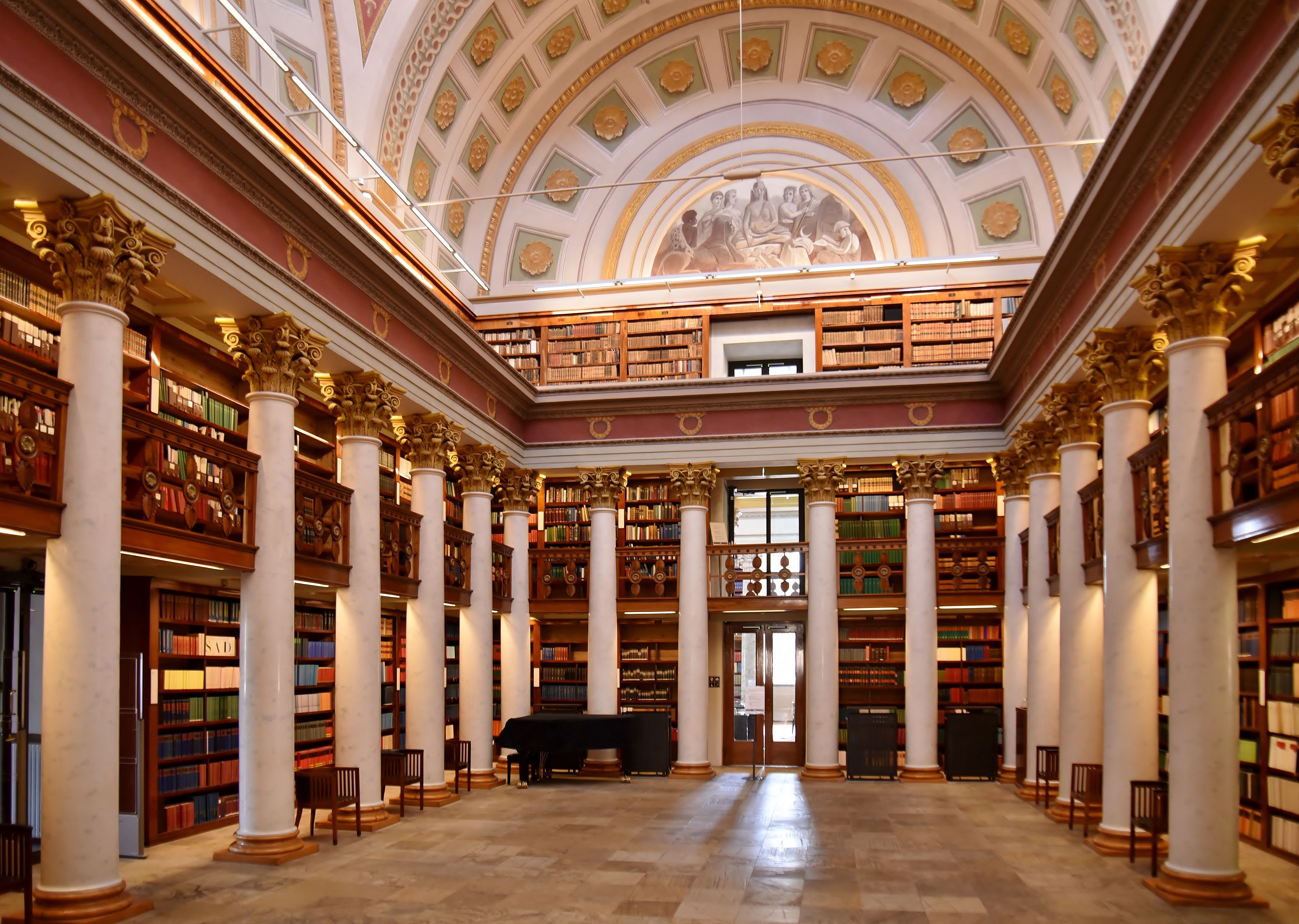
Interior of the National Library of Finland in Helsinki

Among the earliest academic libraries in Europe are Bodleian Library at the University of Oxford (founded in 1602), the Library of Trinity College Dublin (founded in 1592), and Vilnius University Library in Lithuania (founded in 1570).

Unlike U.S. academic libraries, many academic libraries in Europe do not have open stacks like American academic libraries do, which can also apply to an institution's general collections. Although some European academic libraries utilize a classification system similar to or based upon the Dewey Decimal Classification (DDC) used in the U.S., European academic libraries sometimes develop their own systems to organize their collections.

== Modern academic libraries ==
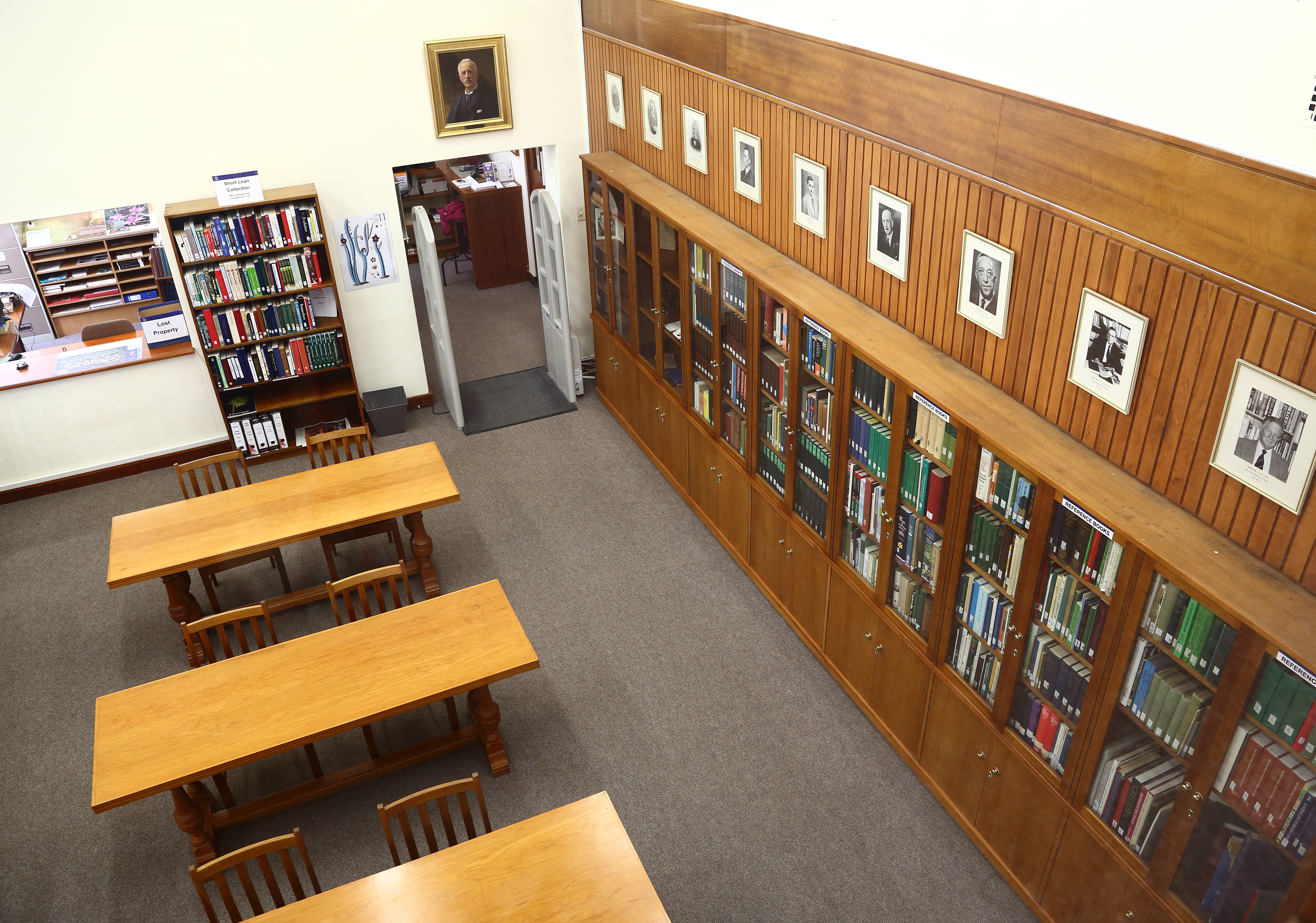
Bolus Herbarium Library at the University of Cape Town in South Africa

Academic libraries have transformed in the 21st century to focus less on physical collection development, information access, and digital resources. Today's academic libraries typically provide access to subscription-based online resources, including research databases and ebook collections, in addition to physical books and journals. Academic libraries also offer space for students to work and study, in groups or individually, on "silent floors" and reference and research help services, sometimes including virtual reference services. Some academic libraries lend out technology such as video cameras, iPads, and calculators. Many academic libraries have remodeled to reflect this changing focus as learning commons. Academic libraries and learning commons often house tutoring, writing centers, and other academic services.

A major focus of modern academic libraries is information literacy instruction, with most American academic libraries employing a person or department of people dedicated primarily to instruction. Many academic institutions offer faculty status to librarians, and librarians are often expected to publish research in their field. Academic librarian positions in the United States usually require an MLIS degree from an ALA-accredited institution.

Academic libraries are increasingly responsible for advancing open science practices. Libraries support open access publishing through institutional repositories, transformative agreements, and assistance with article processing charges. Many provide research data management services, including guidance on data sharing, metadata standards, and compliance with funder mandates. Libraries are also expanding into areas such as open educational resources (OER) and citizen science engagement. This broadening role positions academic libraries as key facilitators in the transition toward more collaborative, inclusive, and sustainable models of scholarship.

== See also ==
- Academic journal
- Internet search engines and libraries
- Library assessment
- Research library
- Research Libraries Group
- Research Libraries UK
- Shadow library
- Trends in library usage
