= Mary Chayko =

American sociologist

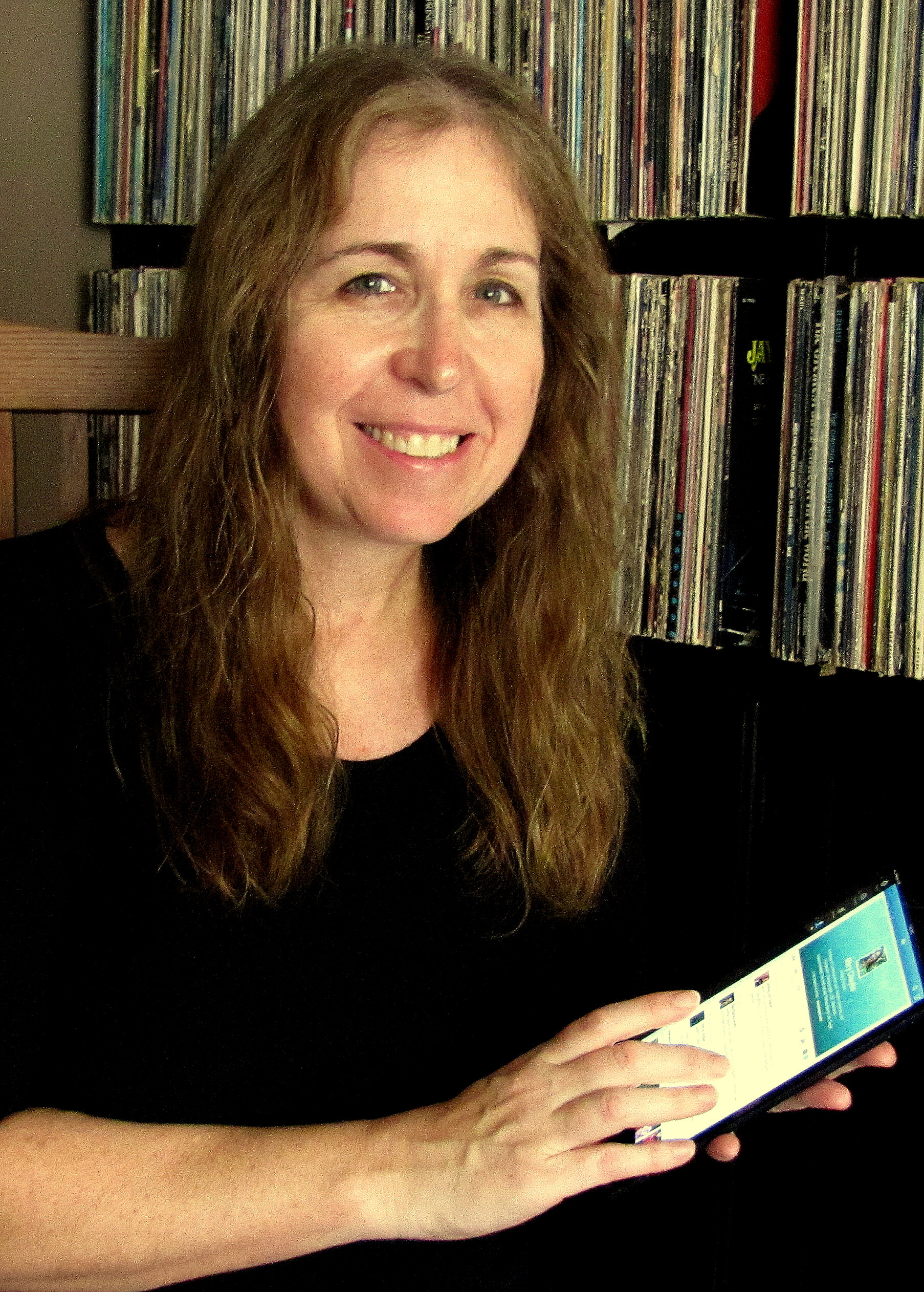
- Born: 1960 (age 65–66)
- Education: Seton Hall University, Rutgers University
- Occupation: Professor at Rutgers School of Communication and Information

Mary Chayko is an American sociologist and Distinguished Teaching Professor of Communication and Information at Rutgers University. She is the director of Undergraduate Interdisciplinary Studies at Rutgers University's School of Communication and Information and she was a six-year Faculty Fellow in Residence at the Rutgers-New Brunswick Honors College (2017–2023). She is an affiliated faculty member of the Sociology Department and Women's, Gender, and Sexuality Studies Department at Rutgers.

Mary Chayko was one of the earliest social scientists to study the social implications of the internet and digital technologies. Her research focuses on the impact of the internet, digital technology, and social media on community, society, and the self. She is the author of multiple academic books and many articles on communication and sociology, exploring the impact of technology from the micro (self, relationships) to the macro (community, society). With the Behavioral Informatics Lab at the School of Communication and Information, she conducts, publishes, and presents research examining the prevalence of gender bias and stereotypes on social media and in household “smart” devices. With the Rutgers Innovation, Design, and Entrepreneurship Academy and physicians at Robert Wood Johnson - Barnabas Hospital, she is exploring ways in which social media and digital technology can be used to help connect patients in need of organ transplants with prospective donors. She also shares her research with the general public, as in the NBC News article, “What is 50 Years Spend on the Internet Worth to Humanity?”

She was honored with the Rutgers University Presidential Award for Excellence in Teaching (2019) and as a Rutgers Faculty of Arts and Sciences Distinguished Contributor to Undergraduate Education (1994). She also created the first course to be honored with the Quality Matters (QM) “Seal of Approval” at Rutgers University, “Digital Technology and Disruptive Change,”” which was jointly designed and submitted for certification by instructional designer Denise Kreiger (2015).

== Early life ==
Mary Chayko grew up in Woodbridge, NJ and went to Woodbridge High School. A musician, she played the flute and sang in school, state, and regional orchestras and choirs. Her interest in music led her to pursue a career as a radio announcer and disc jockey, beginning at Seton Hall University (WSOU-FM), and continuing at such local radio stations as WNNJ-AM (Newton, NJ), WMTR-AM (Morristown, NJ), WDHA-FM (Dover, NJ), WMGQ-FM (New Brunswick, NJ), and WNEW-AM (New York, NY). She has also worked extensively as a voice-over announcer.

== Education ==
Mary Chayko graduated magna cum laude from Seton Hall University with a B.A., double majoring in Communication and Psychology. After receiving an Ed.M. in Counseling Psychology at Rutgers University, she completed an M.A. and Ph.D. in Sociology from Rutgers. Her dissertation “Technology and Togetherness: How We Create and Live in a World of Mental Connections” focused on how people use technology to form social bonds and communities without ever having had face-to-face contact.

== Career ==
=== Saint Elizabeth University ===
Mary Chayko served as Chairperson of the Sociology Department at Saint Elizabeth University (then The College of Saint Elizabeth) from 2001 to 2013. She began at the college as an assistant professor, was promoted to associate professor, and was tenured and promoted to Professor of Sociology in 2008.

=== Rutgers University ===
She joined the School of Communication and Information (SC&I) at Rutgers University in 2014 as an Interdisciplinary Teaching Professor. She chaired the Social Media and Society Research Cluster at SC&I from 2014 to 2019. In 2017, she was appointed Faculty Fellow in Residence at the Rutgers-New Brunswick Honors College, where she has mentored dozens of honors students and teaches first-year Byrne seminars, entitled “Selfies and Digital Culture,” highlighting her research.

As of 2021, she is the Distinguished Teaching Professor of Communication and Information and the director of Undergraduate Interdisciplinary Studies at Rutgers SC&I. She directs the Digital Communication, Information and Media (DCIM) Minor and the Gender and Media Minor at SC&I. The DCIM minor program provides undergraduate students across the Rutgers academic spectrum with the technical, analytical, interpersonal, and entrepreneurial skills to work and lead effectively in digital spaces. The Gender and Media minor program, a partnership with the Department of Women's, Gender and Sexuality Studies at Rutgers School of Arts and Sciences, provides students with the ability to critically analyze and positively impact power imbalances in the media.

== Selected publications ==
- Superconnected: The Internet, Digital Media and Techno-Social Life (Third Edition, 2021, translations in English, Korean, Serbian, and Turkish; Second Edition, 2018; First Edition, 2016). Thousand Oaks, CA: Sage Publications
- Pioneers of Public Sociology: Thirty Years of Humanity and Society. (With Corey Dolgon). 2010. Cambridge, MA: Sloan Publishing
- Portable Communities: The Social Dynamics of Online and Mobile Connectedness. 2008. Albany, NY: State University of New York Press Portable Communities named Best Paper by the International Organization of Social Sciences and Behavioral Research Conference in 2014; Book of the Year Runner-Up by the Association for Humanist Sociology in 2009; and Social Science Bestseller ranked sixth nationally by Library Journal in 2009.
- Connecting: How We Form Social Bonds and Communities in the Internet Age. 2002. Albany, NY: State University of New York Press

== Scholarly articles, reviews, and book chapters ==
- “The Practice of Identity: Development, Expression, Performance, Form.” 2021. pp. 115–125 in Routledge Handbook of Digital Media and Communication. Edited by Leah A. Lievrouw and Brian D. Loader. Routledge.
- “Female Librarians and Male Computer Programmers? Gender Bias in Occupational Images on Digital Media Platforms.” 2020. Journal of the Association for Information Science and Technology. (With Singh, Vivek, K., Inamjar, R., and Floegel, D.) doi: 10.1002/asi.24335
- “Rethinking Community in Communication and Information Studies: Digital Community and Community ‘To Go’.” 2020. Chapter 5, Pp. 99-110 in Rethinking Community Through Transdisciplinary Research. Edited by Bettina Jansen. Palgrave.
- “Reality, Emotionality, and Intimacy in Digital Social Connecting: The Experience of Being Superconnected.” 2019. Sociologjia. LXI:4:513-519.
- “What is 50 Years Spent on the Internet Worth to Humanity?” Oct. 20, 2019. NBC News Online.
- “Digital Technology, Social Media, and Techno-Social Life.” 2019. Chapter 22, pp. 377–397, in Wiley-Blackwell Companion to Sociology, 2nd edition. Edited by George Ritzer and Wendy Wiedenhoft-Murphy. Wiley-Blackwell.
- "In Sync, But Apart": Temporal Symmetry and Digital Connectedness." 2018. Networks, Hacking, and Media: Emerald Studies in Media and Communication. 17:63-72.
- "The First Web Theorist? Georg Simmel and the Legacy of 'The Web of Group-Affiliations'" 2015. Information, Communication and Society
- "Techno-Social Life: The Internet, Digital Technology, and Social Connectedness." 2014. Sociology Compass. 8:7:976-991
- "Book Review: Networked: The New Operating System by Lee Rainie and Barry Wellman." 2014. Sociological Forum. 29:2:517-521.
- "Book Review: The Engaged Sociologist by Kathleen Korgen and Jonathan White." 2012. Humanity and Society. 36:1.85-86.
- "Live Tweeting in the Classroom With a Guest Speaker-Tweeter." 2012. Cyborgology. Nov.
- "I'll Take My Community To Go." 2009. Vodafone Receiver. May, lead article.
- "The Portable Community: Envisioning and Examining Mobile Social Connectedness." 2007. International Journal of Web-based Communities. 3:4:373-385.
- "Author's Response to Review of 'Connecting: How We Form Social Bonds and Communities in the Internet Age.'" 2007. Resource Center for Cyberculture Studies. March.
- "Book Review: Love Online: Emotions on the Internet by Aaron Ben-Ze'ev." 2006. Resource Center for Cyberculture Studies. April.
- "When Culture Met Science: Revisiting a Humanistic Perspective of Science and Society." 2004. Humanity and Society. 27:3:265-268.
- "Book Review: The Internet in Everyday Life, by Barry Wellman and Caroline Haythornthwaite." 2003. Contemporary Sociology. 32:6:728-730.
- "Social Stratification." 2003. In Race, Gender and Class in Sociology: Toward an Inclusive Curriculum, Fifth Edition. Edited by B. Scott, J. Misra, and M. Segal, 5th Edition. Washington, DC: American Sociological Association.
- "The Internet and American Life." 2000. National survey for Princeton Survey Research Consultants (contributor).
- "How You Act Your Age When You Watch TV." 1993. Sociological Forum. 8:4:573-593.
- "What is Real in the Age of Virtual Reality? 'Reframing' Frame Analysis for a Technological World." 1993. Symbolic Interaction. 16:2:171-181
- "Technological Ties That Bind: Media-Generated Primary Groups." 1992. Communication Research. 19:1:109-129. (With Karen A. Cerulo and Janet M. Ruane).

== Media contributions ==
- CBS News. Experts predict how AI, digital tech will shape the world by 2035. June 23, 2023.
- Philadelphia Magazine. Life unfiltered: Why I opened up about my cancer scare on social media. January 31, 2023.
- Washington Post. They asked Lizzo for a dress online. It worked. November 19, 2022.
- NJ. Com Study finds people are more rude, aggressive online. December 5, 2021.
- SiriusXM. Guest on one-hour radio program with Larry Olmsted and Glenn Crooks on sports fans and fan communities. March 31, 2021.
- NJ.com. Why we're shaming NJ residents who don't social distance. May 18, 2020.
- Rutgers Today. Strengthening face-to-face connections online during COVID-19 pandemic. April 10, 2020.
- Women In Academia Report. Rutgers University Study Finds Stereotype Images of Gender Roles in the Workforce Persist Online. February 12, 2020.
- The Daily Targum. Rutgers Research Shows Gender Bias in Media Relating to Different Occupations. February 11, 2020.
- BizCommunity.com Occupational gender bias and stereotypes prevalent online. February 10, 2020.
- Telangana Today. Online images reinforce gender stereotypes. February 6, 2020.
- Rutgers Today. Occupational gender bias prevalent in online images, study finds. February 5, 2020.
- Hyperallergic.com.Online Images Reinforce Gender Biases Around Professions, Study Says. February 5, 2020.
- Business Standard. Occupational gender bias prevalent in social media images: study. February 4, 2020.
- ET&T Magazine. Online images reinforce engineering stereotypes. February 4, 2020.
- Physics.org. Occupational gender bias prevalent in online images, study finds. February 3, 2020.
- Nj.com. How the pasta guy from NJ became a viral flash in the pan. January 8, 2020.
- SiriusXM Radio. Guest on one-hour radio program with Prof. Rick Eckstein (Villanova University) on social media and youth sports. April 24, 2019.
- Daily Targum. New Brunswick found to be top city for students studying communication, media studies. April 16, 2019.
- RU-TV (Rutgers student-run TV) Guest on morning program discussing social media and relationships. Feb. 14, 2019. (Segment begins at 17:40).
- Women's Health Magazine. Yes, The Internet Can Improve Your Mental Health—As Long As You're Smart About It. April 26, 2019.
- NJ.com. So you want to run a Facebook group in NJ? July 29, 2018.
- RU-TV (Rutgers Student-Run TV) Guest on morning program discussing programs and offerings at the School of Communication and Information. April 12, 2018. (segment begins at approximately 15:30)
- Tapinto.com. New Jersey Citizens Tackle the Rising Tide of Hate. February 2, 2017
- Asbury Park Press. "The Election is Stressing People Out - Here's Why." November 7, 2016.
- Rutgers Today. "The Significance of Selfies – Then and Now." October 6, 2016.
- New Books Network, Half-hour interview guest. September 30, 2016.
- Campus Technology magazine, "How to Design Standards-Based Online Courses. July 27, 2016.
- WMGQ-FM "Magic 98.3" (New Brunswick, NJ). Half-hour guest on "@ Central Jersey." June 18, 2016.
- MyCentralJersey.com. Dashcam Video, 911 Call Captures Linden Cop's Earlier DUI Arrest. March 25, 2015.
- Verizon Wireless News Center. "Today's Lesson Plan: Twitter." September 9, 2013.
- Read Media. East Brunswick Resident, Best-Selling Author Dr. Mary Chayko Keynotes at Media and History Conference. April 10, 2012.
- Washington Times. Birth of Blogs for Parents, May 25, 2005.
- Lawrence Journal-World. Packrats, Good Samaritans Recycle Clutter Online, October 11, 2004.
- EC&M Magazine. Mr. Addiss' Neighborhood, April 2004.

== Personal ==
Mary Chayko is married to sports broadcaster and former Rutgers Women's Soccer head coach Glenn Crooks. She has two children, Ryan and Morgan. In her spare time, she sings and plays the flute in a band with fellow sociologists and friends Corey Dolgon and Jim Pennell. The band recorded an album with Rambling Roots Records titled “Songs of Peace and Justice.”

== See also ==
- New Media
- Social Media
- Participatory Culture
- Digitality
- Internet Culture
- Technology and Society
