= University of Parma =

Public university in Parma, Italy

- Università degli Studi di Parma
- Logo of the University of Parma
- Latin: Alma Universitas Studiorum Parmensis
- Type: Public
- Established: 1601; 425 years ago
- Affiliations: SPERA
- Rector: Prof. Paolo Martelli (2023)
- Administrative staff: 1,798
- Students: 26,000 (2016)
- Location: Parma, Italy; 44.8010°N 10.3251°E
- Campus: Both urban (University town) and suburban
- Sports teams: CUS Parma
- Colors: Blue and yellow
- Website: www.unipr.it

The University of Parma (Italian: Università degli Studi di Parma, UNIPR) is a public university located in Parma, Emilia-Romagna, Italy. Organized into nine departments, it is one of the oldest universities in the world. As of 2016, it had approximately 26,000 students.

== History ==
During the 13th-14th centuries there was an educational institution, studium, in Parma, but it was closed in 1387 by Gian Galeazzo Visconti, Duke of Milan. The university was opened in 1412 by Niccolò III d'Este, and, although no papal bull was issued, degrees were granted. In 1420, Filippo Maria Visconti closed it again.

Although there were several attempts to revive the university, which functioned only as a "paper university", granting degrees without teaching. In 1601, the university was finally reopened by Ranuccio I Farnese, and the papal bull was given. It was a joint institution with the Society of Jesus, and a third of staff were teachers from a local Jesuit school, who taught in a separate building and by Jesuit curriculum. There were usually about 27–32 teachers and 300–400 students in the 17th century. Logic, natural history, mathematics and theology were taught by Jesuits and law and medicine by civil teachers. Among the most important Jesuits who taught in Parma should be mentioned Giovanni Battista Riccioli, and Daniello Bartoli.

In 1768, Ferdinand I expelled Jesuits and the curriculum was modernized. Student protests resulted in closure of the university by Marie Louise, Duchess of Parma, in 1831; only in 1854 did Louise Marie Thérèse of Artois re-open it. The university then comprised faculties of theology, law, medicine, physics and mathematics, philosophy, and literature, as well as schools of obstetrics, pharmacy, and veterinary medicine.

After the Risorgimento, the government of newly united Italy divided the universities of the country into two grades. In 1862, the University of Parma was declared grade B, its financing was reduced, and the quality of education degraded. It was equalized with grade A universities only in 1887.

== Notable people ==
- Francesco Accarigi (c. 1557–1622), professor of civil law
- Cesare Beccaria (c. 1738–1794), economist and criminologist
- Attilio Bertolucci (1911–2000), poet
- Alberto Broggi (born 1966), engineer
- Marta Catellani, chemist
- Cristiana De Filippis (born 1992), mathematician
- Flavio Delbono (born 1959), economist and politician
- Vittorio Gallese (born 1959), neuroscientist
- Beppo Levi (1875–1961), mathematician
- Macedonio Melloni (c. 1798–1854), physicist
- Giuseppe Mingione (born 1972), mathematician
- Piero Mozzi (born 1950), medical doctor and naturopath
- Bernardino Ramazzini (c. 1633–1714), professor of medicine and father of Occupational Medicine
- Giacomo Rizzolatti (born 1937), neuroscientist
- Cesare Zavattini (1902–1989), screenwriter

== Organization ==
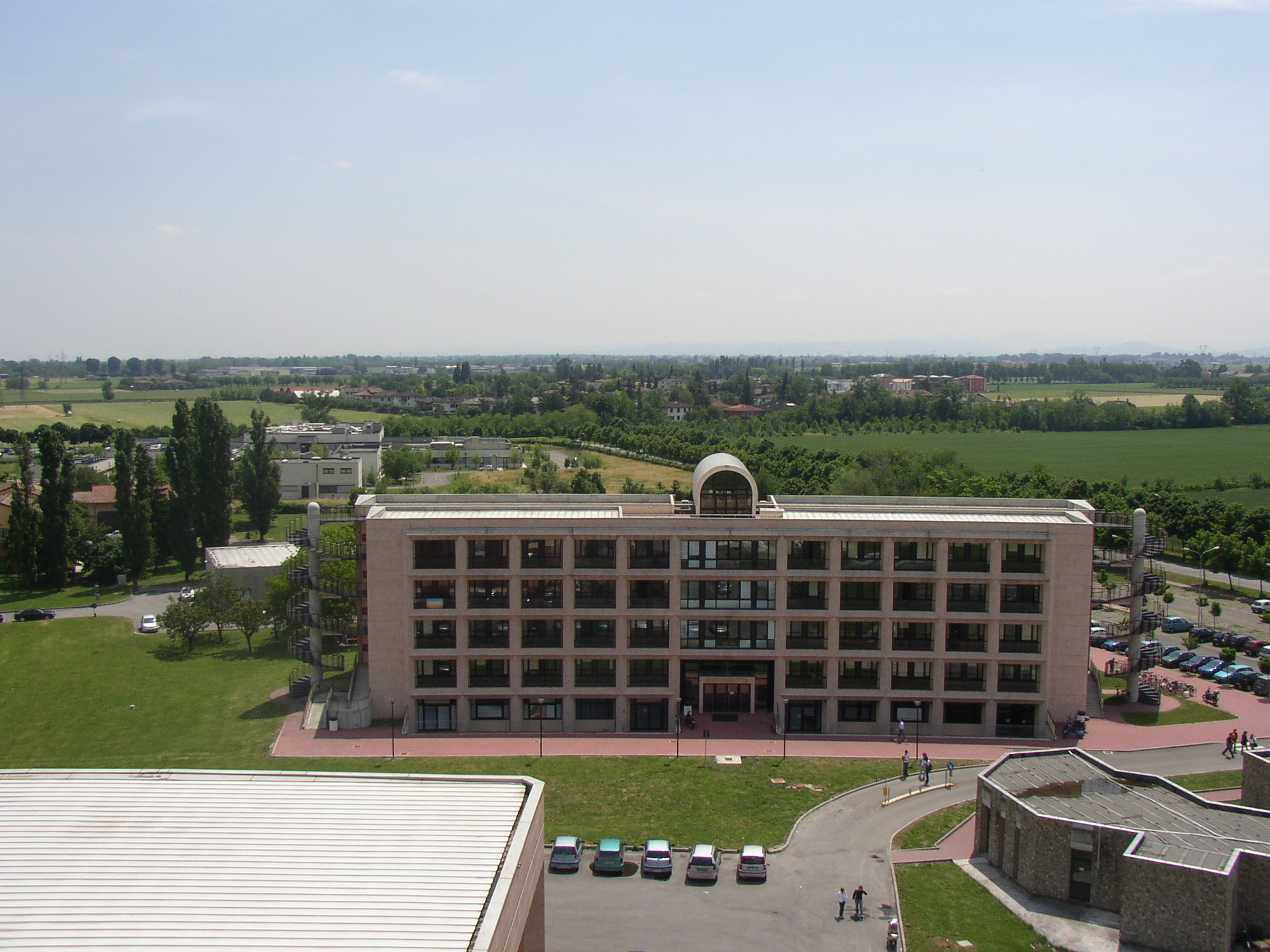
Mathematics and Computer Science Building at the University of Parma

The university is now divided into 9 departments.

- Department of Chemistry, Life Sciences and Environmental Sustainability
- Department of Economics and Management
- Department of Engineering and Architecture
- Department of Food and Drug
- Department of Humanities, Social Sciences and Cultural Industries
- Department of Law, Politics and International Studies
- Department of Mathematical, Physical and Computer Sciences
- Department of Medicine and Surgery
- Department of Veterinary Science

From 2012 to 2016 the university was divided into 18 departments:

- Department of Arts and Literature, History and Social Studies
- Department of Biomedical, Biotechnological and translational Sciences
- Department of Chemistry
- Department of Civil, Environmental, Land Management, Engineering and Architecture - DICATEA
- Department of Classics, Modern Languages, Education, Philosophy (A.L.E.F.)
- Department of Clinical and experimental Medicine
- Department of Economics
- Department of Food Science
- Department of Industrial Engineering
- Department of Information Engineering
- Department of Law
- Department of Life sciences
- Department of Mathematics and Computer Science
- Department of Neuroscience
- Department of Pharmacy
- Department of Physics and earth sciences “Macedonio Melloni”
- Department of Surgery

The university was formerly divided into 12 faculties:

- Faculty of Agriculture
- Faculty of Architecture
- Faculty of Arts and Philosophy
- Faculty of Economics
- Faculty of Engineering
- Faculty of Law
- Faculty of Mathematics, Physics and Natural Science.
- Faculty of Medicine and Surgery
- Faculty of Pharmacy
- Faculty of Political Sciences
- Faculty of Psychology
- Faculty of Veterinary Medicine

Research Labs in the Department of Engineering and Architecture

1. Industrial Automation Laboratory
2. IoT Lab

== See also ==
- European College of Parma
- List of Italian universities
- List of medieval universities
- ICoN Interuniversity Consortium for Italian Studies
- Library assessment

== Books ==
- Grendler, Paul F. (2004). The Universities of the Italian Renaissance. Baltimore MD USA: Johns Hopkins University Press. pp. 127–137. ISBN 978-0-8018-8055-1.
- Grendler, Paul F. (2017). The Jesuits and Italian Universities, 1548-1773. Washington DC: CUA Press. pp. 154–188. ISBN 978-0-8132-2936-2.
- Annali di Storia delle Università italiane. Vol. 9. 2005.

== See also ==
- List of Jesuit sites
