= Tangent measure =

In measure theory, tangent measures are used to study the local behavior of Radon measures, in much the same way as tangent spaces are used to study the local behavior of differentiable manifolds. Tangent measures (introduced by David Preiss in his study of rectifiable sets) are a useful tool in geometric measure theory. For example, they are used in proving Marstrand's theorem and Preiss' theorem.

== Definition ==
Consider a Radon measure μ defined on an open subset Ω of n-dimensional Euclidean space R^{n} and let a be an arbitrary point in Ω. We can "zoom in" on a small open ball of radius r around a, B_{r}(a), via the transformation

$$T_{a,r}(x)=\frac{x-a}{r},$$

which enlarges the ball of radius r about a to a ball of radius 1 centered at 0. With this, we may now zoom in on how μ behaves on B_{r}(a) by looking at the push-forward measure defined by

$$T_{a,r \#}\mu(A)=\mu(a+rA)$$

where

$$a+rA=\{a+rx:x\in A\}.$$

As r gets smaller, this transformation on the measure μ spreads out and enlarges the portion of μ supported around the point a. We can get information about our measure around a by looking at what these measures tend to look like in the limit as r approaches zero.

Definition. A tangent measure of a Radon measure μ at the point a is a second Radon measure ν such that there exist sequences of positive numbers c_{i} > 0 and decreasing radii r_{i} → 0 such that

$$\lim_{i\rightarrow\infty} c_{i}T_{a,r_{i}\#}\mu =\nu$$

where the limit is taken in the weak-∗ topology, i.e., for any continuous function φ with compact support in Ω,

$$\lim_{i\rightarrow\infty}\int_{\Omega} \varphi \, \mathrm{d} (c_{i}T_{a,r_{i}\#}\mu)=\int_{\Omega} \varphi \, \mathrm{d} \nu.$$

We denote the set of tangent measures of μ at a by Tan(μ, a).

== Existence ==
The set Tan(μ, a) of tangent measures of a measure μ at a point a in the support of μ is nonempty on mild conditions on μ. By the weak compactness of Radon measures, Tan(μ, a) is nonempty if one of the following conditions hold:

- μ is asymptotically doubling at a, i.e. $\limsup_{r\downarrow 0} \frac{\mu(B(a,2r))}{\mu(B(a,r))}<\infty$
- μ has positive and finite upper density, i.e. $0<\limsup_{r\downarrow 0}\frac{\mu(B(a,r))}{r^s}<\infty$ for some $0<s<\infty$.

== Properties ==
The collection of tangent measures at a point is closed under two types of scaling. Cones of measures were also defined by Preiss.

- The set Tan(μ, a) of tangent measures of a measure μ at a point a in the support of μ is a cone of measures, i.e. if $\nu\in \mathrm{Tan}(\mu,a)$ and $c>0$, then $c\nu\in \mathrm{Tan}(\mu,a)$.
- The cone Tan(μ, a) of tangent measures of a measure μ at a point a in the support of μ is a d-cone or dilation invariant, i.e. if $\nu\in \mathrm{Tan}(\mu,a)$ and $r>0$, then $T_{0,r\#}\nu \in \mathrm{Tan}(\mu,a)$.

At typical points in the support of a measure, the cone of tangent measures is also closed under translations.

- At μ almost every a in the support of μ, the cone Tan(μ, a) of tangent measures of μ at a is translation invariant, i.e. if $\nu\in\mathrm{Tan}(\mu,a)$ and x is in the support of ν, then $T_{x,1\#}\nu\in\mathrm{Tan}(\mu,a)$.

== Examples ==
- Suppose we have a circle in R^{2} with uniform measure on that circle. Then, for any point a in the circle, the set of tangent measures will just be positive constants times 1-dimensional Hausdorff measure supported on the line tangent to the circle at that point.
- In 1995, Tacey O'Neil produced an example of a Radon measure μ on R^{d} such that, for μ-almost every point a ∈ R^{d}, Tan(μ, a) consists of all nonzero Radon measures.

== Related concepts ==
There is an associated notion of the tangent space of a measure. A k-dimensional subspace P of R^{n} is called the k-dimensional tangent space of μ at a ∈ Ω if — after appropriate rescaling — μ "looks like" k-dimensional Hausdorff measure H^{k} on P. More precisely:

Definition. P is the k-dimensional tangent space of μ at a if there is a θ > 0 such that

$$\mu_{a, r} \xrightarrow[r \to 0]{*} \theta H^{k} \lfloor_{P},$$

where μ_{a,r} is the translated and rescaled measure given by

$$\mu_{a, r} (A) = \frac1{r^{n - 1}} \mu(a + r A).$$

The number θ is called the multiplicity of μ at a, and the tangent space of μ at a is denoted T_{a}(μ).

Further study of tangent measures and tangent spaces leads to the notion of a varifold.
