= Varifold =

Concept in measure theory

In mathematics, a varifold is, loosely speaking, a measure-theoretic generalization of the concept of a differentiable manifold, by replacing differentiability requirements with those provided by rectifiable sets, while maintaining the general algebraic structure usually seen in differential geometry. Varifolds generalize the idea of a rectifiable current, and are studied in geometric measure theory.

== Historical note ==
Varifolds were first introduced by Laurence Chisholm Young in (Young 1951), under the name "generalized surfaces". Frederick J. Almgren Jr. slightly modified the definition in his mimeographed notes (Almgren 1965) and coined the name varifold: he wanted to emphasize that these objects are substitutes for ordinary manifolds in problems of the calculus of variations. The modern approach to the theory was based on Almgren's notes and laid down by William K. Allard, in the paper (Allard 1972).

== Definition ==
Given an open subset $\Omega$ of Euclidean space $\mathbb{R}^n$, an m-dimensional varifold on $\Omega$ is defined as a Radon measure on the set

$$\Omega \times G(n,m)$$

where $G(n,m)$ is the Grassmannian of all m-dimensional linear subspaces of an n-dimensional vector space. The Grassmannian is used to allow the construction of analogs to differential forms as duals to vector fields in the approximate tangent space of the set $\Omega$.

The particular case of a rectifiable varifold is the data of a m-rectifiable set M (which is measurable with respect to the m-dimensional Hausdorff measure), and a density function defined on M, which is a positive function θ measurable and locally integrable with respect to the m-dimensional Hausdorff measure. It defines a Radon measure V on the Grassmannian bundle of $\mathbb{R}^n$

$$V(A) := \int_{\Gamma_{M,A}}\!\!\!\!\!\!\!\theta(x) \mathrm{d} \mathcal{H}^m(x)$$

where

- $\Gamma_{M,A}=M \cap \{x : (x, \mathrm{Tan}^m(x,M)) \in A \}$
- $\mathcal{H}^m(x)$ is the $m$−dimensional Hausdorff measure

Rectifiable varifolds are weaker objects than locally rectifiable currents: they do not have any orientation. Replacing M with more regular sets, one easily see that differentiable submanifolds are particular cases of rectifiable manifolds.

Due to the lack of orientation, there is no boundary operator defined on the space of varifolds.

== See also ==
- Current
- Geometric measure theory
- Grassmannian
- Plateau's problem
- Radon measure
