= Red Biddy =

Red Biddy may refer to:

- Red Biddy (1978), play by Heno Magee
- Red Biddy aka Rachel Pinney, of the Ferguson's Gang
- Edinburgh Corporation Tramways Car 180, nicknamed "Red Biddy"
- Red Biddy and Other Stories (1966), by Charlotte Hough
- Red Biddy, portrayed by Constance Smith, in Don't Say Die (1950)
- Red Biddy, infantry platoon anti-tank missile, cancelled 1953, see Rainbow Code research projects
- Red Biddy Records, The Makem Brothers recordings
- Red Biddy, cheap fortified wine
- "Red Biddy", song by Mick Audsley
- Red Biddy, salve to soothe irritation on cows' udders, like Bag Balm
