= Aizik Volpert =

Soviet and Israeli mathematician and chemical engineer

Aizik Isaakovich Vol'pert
- Айзик Исаакович Вольперт
- Born: 5 June 1923; Kharkov
- Died: January 2006 (aged 82); Haifa
- Education: Lviv University; Moscow University
- Known for: Functions of bounded variation; index theory; partial differential equations; parabolic partial differential equations mathematical chemistry
- Scientific career
- Workplaces: Lviv University; Lviv Industrial Forestry Institute; Technion

Aizik Isaakovich Vol'pert (Russian: Айзик Исаакович Вольперт; 5 June 1923 – January 2006) (the family name is also transliterated as Volpert or Wolpert) was a Soviet and Israeli mathematician and chemical engineer working in partial differential equations, functions of bounded variation and chemical kinetics.

== Life and academic career ==
Vol'pert graduated from Lviv University in 1951, earning the candidate of science degree and the docent title respectively in 1954 and 1956 from the same university: from 1951 on he worked at the Lviv Industrial Forestry Institute. In 1961 he became senior research fellow while 1962 he earned the "doktor nauk" degree from Moscow State University. In the 1970s–1980s A. I. Volpert became one of the leaders of the Russian Mathematical Chemistry scientific community. He finally joined Technion’s Faculty of Mathematics in 1993, doing his Aliyah in 1994.

== Work ==
=== Index theory and elliptic boundary problems ===
Vol'pert developed an effective algorithm for calculating the index of an elliptic problem before the Atiyah-Singer index theorem appeared: He was also the first to show that the index of a singular matrix operator can be different from zero.

=== Functions of bounded variation ===
He was one of the leading contributors to the theory of BV-functions: he introduced the concept of functional superposition, which enabled him to construct a calculus for such functions and applying it in the theory of partial differential equations. Precisely, given a continuously differentiable function $f:\mathbb{R}^p \to \mathbb{R}$ and a function of bounded variation $\boldsymbol{u}(\boldsymbol x)= (u_1(\boldsymbol{x}), \ldots , u_p(\boldsymbol{x}))$ with $\boldsymbol{x}\in \Bbb R^n$ and $n\ge 1$, he proves that $f\circ \boldsymbol{u}(\boldsymbol{x}) = f(\boldsymbol{u}(\boldsymbol{x}))$ is again a function of bounded variation and the following chain rule formula holds:

$$\frac{\partial f(\boldsymbol{u}(\boldsymbol{x}))}{\partial x_i}=\sum_{k=1}^p\frac{\partial\bar{f}(\boldsymbol{u}(\boldsymbol{x}))}{\partial u_k}\frac{\partial{u_k(\boldsymbol{x})}}{\partial x_i}
\qquad\forall i=1,\ldots,n$$

where ${\bar f}(\boldsymbol{u}(\boldsymbol{x}))$ is the already cited functional superposition of $f$ and $\boldsymbol u$. By using his results, it is easy to prove that functions of bounded variation form an algebra of discontinuous functions: in particular, using his calculus for $n=1$, it is possible to define the product $H\cdot \delta$ of the Heaviside step function $H(x)$ and the Dirac distribution $\delta(x)$ in one variable.

=== Chemical kinetics ===
His work on chemical kinetics and chemical engineering led him to define and study differential equations on graphs.

== Selected publications ==
=== Books ===
- Hudjaev, Sergei Ivanovich; Vol'pert, Aizik Isaakovich (1985), Analysis in classes of discontinuous functions and equations of mathematical physics, Mechanics: analysis, vol. 8, Dordrecht–Boston–Lancaster: Martinus Nijhoff Publishers, pp. xviii+678, ISBN 90-247-3109-7, MR 0785938, Zbl 0564.46025. One of the best books about BV-functions and their application to problems of mathematical physics, particularly chemical kinetics.
- Vol'pert, Aizik I.; Vol'pert, Vitaly A.; Vol'pert, Vladimir A. (1994), Traveling Wave Solutions of Parabolic Systems, Translations of Mathematical Monographs, vol. 140, Providence, R.I.: American Mathematical Society, pp. xii+448, ISBN 0-8218-3393-6, MR 1297766, Zbl 1001.35060.

=== Papers ===
- Vol'pert, Aizik Isaakovich (1967), Пространства BV и квазилинейные уравнени, Matematicheskii Sbornik, (N.S.) (in Russian), 73(115) (2): 255–302, MR 0216338, Zbl 0168.07402. A seminal paper where Caccioppoli sets and BV functions are thoroughly studied and the concept of functional superposition is introduced and applied to the theory of partial differential equations: it was also translated as Vol'Pert, A. I. (1967), "Spaces BV and quasi-linear equations", Mathematics of the USSR-Sbornik, 2 (2): 225–267, Bibcode:1967SbMat...2..225V, doi:10.1070/SM1967v002n02ABEH002340, hdl:10338.dmlcz/102500, MR 0216338, Zbl 0168.07402.
- Vol'pert, Aizik Isaakovich (1972), Дифференциальные уравнения на графах, Matematicheskii Sbornik, (N.S.) (in Russian), 88(130) (4(8)): 578–588, MR 0316796, Zbl 0242.35015, translated in English as Vol'Pert, A. I. (1972), "Differential equations on graphs", Mathematics of the USSR-Sbornik, 17 (4): 571–582, Bibcode:1972SbMat..17..571V, doi:10.1070/SM1972v017n04ABEH001603, Zbl 0255.35013.
- Vasiliev, V. M.; Volpert, A. I.; Hudiaev, S. I. (1973), "On the method of quasi-stationary concentrations for chemical kinetics equations", Журнал вычислительной математики и математической физики (in Russian), 13 (3): 683–697.
- Vol'pert, A. I. (1976), "Qualitative methods of investigation of equations of chemical kinetics", Preprint (in Russian), Institute of Chemical Physics, Chernogolovka.
- Vol'pert, V. A.; Vol'pert, A. I.; Merzhanov, A. G. (1982), "Application of the theory of bifurcations in study of the spinning combustion waves", Doklady Akademii Nauk SSSR (in Russian), 262 (3): 642–645.
- Vol'pert, V. A.; Vol'pert, A. I.; Merzhanov, A. G. (1982b), "Analysis of nonunidimensional combustion modes by bifurcation theory methods", Doklady Akademii Nauk SSSR (in Russian), 263 (4): 918–921.
- Vol'pert, V. A.; Vol'pert, A. I.; Merzhanov, A. G. (1983), "Application of the theory of bifurcations to the study of unsteady regimes of combustion", Fizika Goreniya i Vzryva (in Russian), 19: 69–72, translated in English as Vol'Pert, V. A.; Vol'Pert, A. I.; Merzhanov, A. G. (1983), "Application of the theory of bifurcations to the investigation of nonstationary combustion regimes", Combustion, Explosion, and Shock Waves, 19 (4): 435–438, Bibcode:1983CESW...19..435V, doi:10.1007/BF00783642, S2CID 97950149.
- Vol'pert, V. A.; Vol'pert, A. I. (1989), "Existence and stability of traveling waves in chemical kinetics", Dynamics of Chemical and Biological Systems (in Russian), Novosibirsk: Nauka, pp. 56–131.
- Vol'pert, A. I. (1996), "Propagation of Waves Described by Nonlinear Parabolic Equations (a commentary on article 6)", in Oleinik, O. A. (ed.), I. G. Petrovsky Selected works. Part II: Differential equations and probability theory, Classics of Soviet Mathematics, vol. 5 (part 2), Amsterdam: Gordon and Breach Publishers, pp. 364–399, ISBN 2-88124-979-5, MR 1677648, Zbl 0948.01043.
- Vol'pert, V. A.; Vol'pert, A. I. (1998), "Convective instability of reaction fronts: linear stability analysis", European Journal of Applied Mathematics, 9 (5): 507–525, doi:10.1017/S095679259800357X, MR 1662311, S2CID 121533943, Zbl 0918.76027.

== See also ==
- Atiyah-Singer index theorem
- Bounded variation
- Caccioppoli set
- Differential equation on a graph
