= Mumford–Shah functional =

Mathematics concept

The Mumford–Shah functional is a functional that is used to establish an optimality criterion for segmenting an image into sub-regions. An image is modeled as a piecewise-smooth function. The functional penalizes the distance between the model and the input image, the lack of smoothness of the model within the sub-regions, and the length of the boundaries of the sub-regions. By minimizing the functional one may compute the best image segmentation. The functional was proposed by mathematicians David Mumford and Jayant Shah in 1989.

== Definition of the Mumford–Shah functional ==
Consider an image I with a domain of definition D, call J the image's model, and call B the boundaries that are associated with the model: the Mumford–Shah functional E[ J,B ] is defined as

$$E[J,B] = \alpha \int_D (I(\vec x) - J(\vec x))^2  \,\mathrm{d}\vec x + \beta
\int _{D/B} \vec \nabla J(\vec x) \cdot \vec \nabla J(\vec x) \,\mathrm{d} \vec x + \gamma \int _B
ds$$

Optimization of the functional may be achieved by approximating it with another functional, as proposed by Ambrosio and Tortorelli.

== Minimization of the functional ==
=== Ambrosio–Tortorelli limit ===
Ambrosio and Tortorelli showed that the Mumford–Shah functional E[ J,B ] can be obtained as the limit of a family of energy functionals E[ J,z,ε ] where the boundary B is replaced by continuous function z whose magnitude indicates the presence of a boundary. Their analysis show that the Mumford–Shah functional has a well-defined minimum. It also yields an algorithm for estimating the minimum.

The functionals they define have the following form:

$$E[J,z;\varepsilon] = \alpha \int (I(\vec x) - J(\vec x))^2 \,\mathrm{d} \vec x +
\beta \int z(\vec x) |\vec \nabla J(\vec x)|^2 \,\mathrm{d} \vec x + \gamma \int
\{ \varepsilon |\vec \nabla z(\vec x)|^2 + \varepsilon ^{-1} \phi ^2(z(\vec
x))\} \,\mathrm{d} \vec x$$

where ε > 0 is a (small) parameter and ϕ(z) is a potential function. Two typical choices for ϕ(z) are

- $\phi _1(z) = (1-z^2)/2 \quad z \in [-1,1].$ This choice associates the edge set B with the set of points z such that ϕ_{1}(z) ≈ 0
- $\phi _2(z) = z(1-z) \quad z \in [0,1].$ This choice associates the edge set B with the set of points z such that ϕ_{2}(z) ≈ 1/4

The non-trivial step in their deduction is the proof that, as $\epsilon\to 0$, the last two terms of the energy function (i.e. the last integral term of the energy functional) converge to the edge set integral ∫_{B}ds.

The energy functional E[ J,z,ε ] can be minimized by gradient descent methods, assuring the convergence to a local minimum.

Ambrosio, Fusco, and Hutchinson, established a result to give an optimal estimate of the Hausdorff dimension of the singular set of minimizers of the Mumford-Shah energy.

=== Minimization by splitting into one-dimensional problems ===
The Mumford-Shah functional can be split into coupled one-dimensional subproblems. The subproblems are solved exactly by dynamic programming.

== See also ==
- Bounded variation
- Caccioppoli set
- Digital image processing
- Luigi Ambrosio
