= Antonia Kwiatkowska =

Polish noblewoman and wife of Mikhail Bakunin (died 1887)

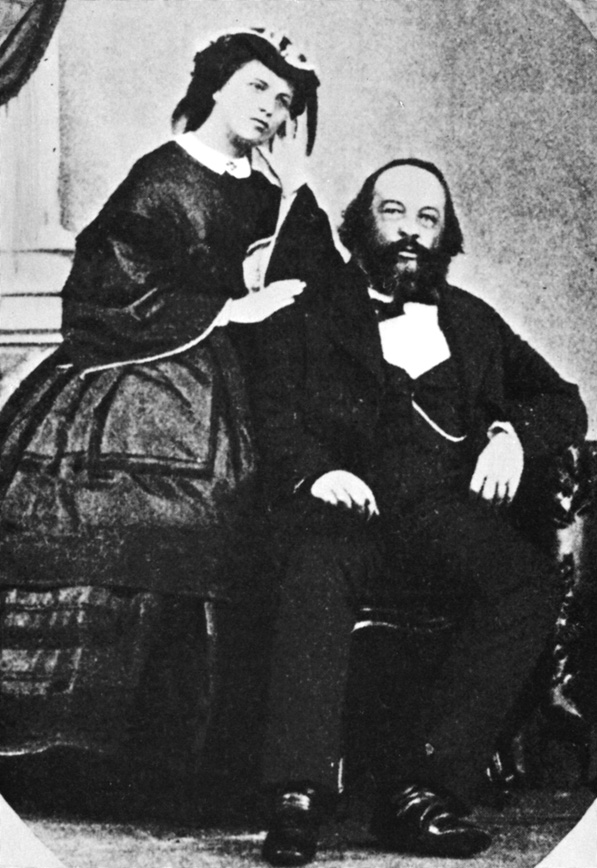
- Antonia Kwiatkowska with her husband Mikhail Bakunin
- Born: 1840 or 1843
- Died: 2 June 1887; San Giorgio a Cremano or Portici, Italy
- Other names: Antonina Kwiatkowska; Antonija Kwiatkowska; Antossia
- Occupation: Noblewoman
- Spouses: Mikhail Bakunin (m. 1858; died 1876); Carlo Gambuzzi (m. 1879)
- Children: 4, including Maria Bakunin
- Relatives: Renato Caccioppoli (grandson)

Antonia Kwiatkowska (born 1840 or 1843; died 2 June 1887), also known as Antonina Kwiatkowska, Antonija Kwiatkowska and Antossia, was a Polish noblewoman who was married to the Russian revolutionary Mikhail Bakunin and, subsequently, to the Italian anarchist Carlo Gambuzzi.

== Biography ==
=== Origins and marriage to Bakunin ===
Born into a family of Polish origin, Antonia was the daughter of Ksawery Vasilevich Kwiatkowski, who was of Belarusian origin and belonged to a family of the Catholic lesser nobility of the Mogilev Governorate. He had moved to Siberia in the 1840s and found employment in the gold-mining industry, first with Astashev's enterprise and later with Benardaki's. Her mother, Julia Michatowska, was of Polish origin. Antonia had four siblings: Jan, Aleksandr, Sofia and Julia.

Her year of birth is uncertain, with sources variously giving 1840 and 1843. However, the record of her marriage, celebrated in October 1858, described her as seventeen years old, which would place her birth between 1840 and 1841.

Antonia met her future husband Mikhail Bakunin in Tomsk, where the revolutionary had been transferred in 1857 after several years of imprisonment in Tsarist prisons. Bakunin met the Kwiatkowski family in Tomsk and offered to teach French and other subjects to Antonia and her sister Sofia. A relationship developed between Bakunin and Antonia, initially opposed by her father, who would have preferred her to marry a man with a more stable social position. The intervention of Nikolay Muravyov-Amursky, Governor-General of Eastern Siberia and a relative of Bakunin, helped secure her father's consent.

They married at the Church of the Resurrection in Tomsk on 5 October 1858 according to the Julian calendar, corresponding to 17 October in the Gregorian calendar. The original marriage record is not known to have survived, but its contents are preserved in later extracts. It recorded Antonia as a Catholic member of the nobility, while Bakunin was described as a former artillery officer of the Orthodox faith.

In 1861 Bakunin escaped from Siberia, travelling first to Japan, then to the United States and finally to Western Europe. Antonia initially remained in Russia while awaiting permission to join him. In a letter of June 1862, she expressed her wish to be reunited with her husband despite the obstacles imposed by the Russian authorities; she eventually joined him in Europe.

=== Life in Europe and relationship with Carlo Gambuzzi ===
Carlo Gambuzzi, Bakunin's associate in Naples and Antonia's second husband.

During the 1860s Antonia accompanied Bakunin on various stays in Europe, including in Naples, where the Russian revolutionary established contacts with local democratic and socialist circles. There she met the lawyer Carlo Gambuzzi, one of Bakunin's principal Italian collaborators and a future leader in the International Workingmen's Association, with whom she began a romantic relationship.

Three children were born during her marriage to Bakunin: Carlo, born in Vevey on 5 May 1868; Sofia, born in Orselina on 17 January 1870; and Maria, known as Marussia, born in Krasnoyarsk on 2 February 1873. All three bore the surname Bakunin, although historical accounts identify Gambuzzi as their probable biological father. Bakunin was aware of the relationship between his wife and his collaborator but agreed to maintain the family relationship. In a letter to Nikolay Ogarev dated December 1869, he acknowledged Gambuzzi as the biological father of Antonia's first two children, while declaring that he nevertheless regarded them as his own. The family experienced financial difficulties and disagreements over the children's support and education, to which Gambuzzi also contributed financially.

In 1874 the family faced further financial difficulties, partly related to the ownership of the Baronata estate near Locarno, where they lived. Before taking part in the attempted uprising in Bologna, Bakunin informed his wife in a letter that the property actually belonged to Carlo Cafiero and would have to be returned to him, causing Antonia profound disappointment. Bakunin also asked his sister-in-law Sofia Łossowska, Antonia's sister, to negotiate with his relatives in Russia to obtain his share of an inheritance. At the end of the year, after the failure of the insurrection, the family was forced to move to Lugano, where they lived in straitened circumstances.

In the spring of 1875 Bakunin managed to purchase a house on credit in Besso, near Lugano, intending to repay the debt using the proceeds of his inheritance. The negotiations were again entrusted to Sofia Łossowska, who succeeded in obtaining a woodland property, although its income proved insufficient to resolve the family's financial difficulties. Bakunin therefore decided to move to Naples, where he hoped to find more favourable living conditions and financial support from Gambuzzi.

Around mid-June 1876, shortly before his death, Bakunin entrusted Antonia with a substantial portion of his papers, including manuscripts, letters, notes and other documents of a mainly philosophical and political nature. He handed them over as she prepared to leave for Naples to arrange the family's move. Antonia herself placed the papers in a trunk in Bakunin's presence, according to the later recollection of a witness who had stayed with the family. Antonia left for Naples, while Bakunin travelled to Bern, where he intended to receive treatment from the physician Adolf Vogt.

According to an account given many years later by their daughter Maria, Bakunin had originally planned to join Antonia in Naples after his stay in Bern, while she had gone ahead to find accommodation on the Neapolitan coast. His death on 1 July 1876 prevented Antonia from being with him during his final moments. She was distraught when she learned of his death, as was also confirmed by her sister Sofia Łossowska.

Following her husband's death, Antonia moved with her children to Naples and settled at Gambuzzi's villa in Capodimonte.

=== Later years in Naples ===
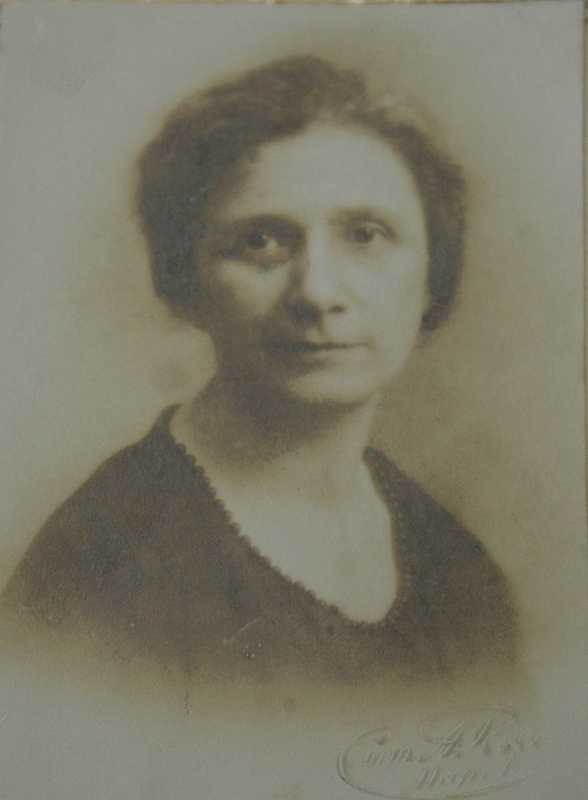
Maria Bakunin defended her mother's memory against accusations that she had failed to support her husband during his lifetime.

On 19 January 1879, Antonia and Gambuzzi married in a civil ceremony at the municipal offices of Posillipo. Their daughter Tatiana was also born that year. She later married a Polish citizen and died with her family during the Nazi occupation of Warsaw in the Second World War.

After Bakunin's death, Antonia became involved in disputes concerning the possible publication of the revolutionary's papers, of which she was the custodian. With the consent of the Bakunin–Gambuzzi family, some of the documents were entrusted to various committees charged with considering their publication, but editorial difficulties and disagreements among those involved delayed the undertaking for many years. After Antonia's death, custody of the documents passed to Gambuzzi and subsequently to the children. A substantial part of the archive was eventually acquired by Max Nettlau, who promoted its preservation and study.

Antonia died on 2 June 1887, either in San Giorgio a Cremano or in Portici. According to her daughter Maria, writing in two letters to Nettlau dated 15 March 1935 and 2 January 1938, the cause of death was tuberculosis. Her body was embalmed and subsequently interred in the Bakunin–Gambuzzi family chapel at the monumental cemetery of Naples.

In her correspondence with Nettlau, Maria defended her mother's memory against criticism of her conduct during her marriage to Bakunin. She described Antonia as a woman who had endured numerous hardships to support her husband and children. She strongly rejected accounts portraying her mother as having led a comfortable life and as being indifferent to the revolutionary's financial difficulties, arguing instead that Antonia had sacrificed her own material needs for the family's welfare.

Her descendants included her daughter Maria, who became one of the first women to pursue a university career in the chemical sciences in Italy, and her grandson Renato Caccioppoli, a mathematician and Sofia's son.

== Works about Antonia Kwiatkowska ==
In 2018 the writer Marinella Gargiulo published the biographical novel Il diario di Antossia, which presented Antonia Kwiatkowska's life in diary form, focusing in particular on her relationships with Mikhail Bakunin and Carlo Gambuzzi. The book was proposed for the 2019 Strega Prize by Marcello Rotili.

- Gargiulo, Marinella (2018). Il diario di Antossia (in Italian). Naples: Guida Editori. ISBN 9788868663889.

== Bibliography ==
- Accattoli, Agnese (2019). "Bakunin, Karl Michajlovič; Bakunina, Marija Michajlovna; Bakunina, Sofija Michajlovna". In d'Amelia, Antonella; Rizzi, Daniela (eds.). Русское присутствие в Италии в первой половине XX века. Энциклопедия (in Russian). Moscow: ROSSPEN. pp. 74–76.
- Kramer, Bernd; Eckhardt, Wolfgang, eds. (2007). Bakunin Almanach (in German). Vol. 1. Berlin: Karin Kramer Verlag. ISBN 9783879563203. Archived from the original on 11 February 2026.
- Colella, Carmine (2015). "Marussia Bakunin: una rilettura aggiornata della vita e della carriera" (PDF). Atti dell'Accademia Pontaniana (in Italian). LXIII: 123–165. Archived from the original (PDF) on 12 October 2026.
- Colella, Carmine; Dritsakou, Maria Glykeria (2021). "Ritratto inedito di Maria Bakunin quale si disvela dall'esame della lunga corrispondenza con Max Nettlau" (PDF). Atti dell'Accademia Pontaniana (in Italian). LXIX: 55–136. Archived from the original (PDF) on 20 November 2024.
- Colella, Carmine; Carbone, Luciano (2022). "Assilli e disagi nella discendenza napoletana di Michail Bakunin" (PDF). Atti dell'Accademia Pontaniana (in Italian). LXX: 131–140. Archived from the original (PDF) on 6 July 2024.
- Talalay, Mikhail (2014). Российский некрополь в Италии (PDF) (in Russian). Moscow: Staraya Basmannaya. ISBN 9785906470188. Archived from the original (PDF) on 8 March 2023.
