= Maria Bakunin =

Italian chemist and geologist (1873–1960)

- Мария Бакунин
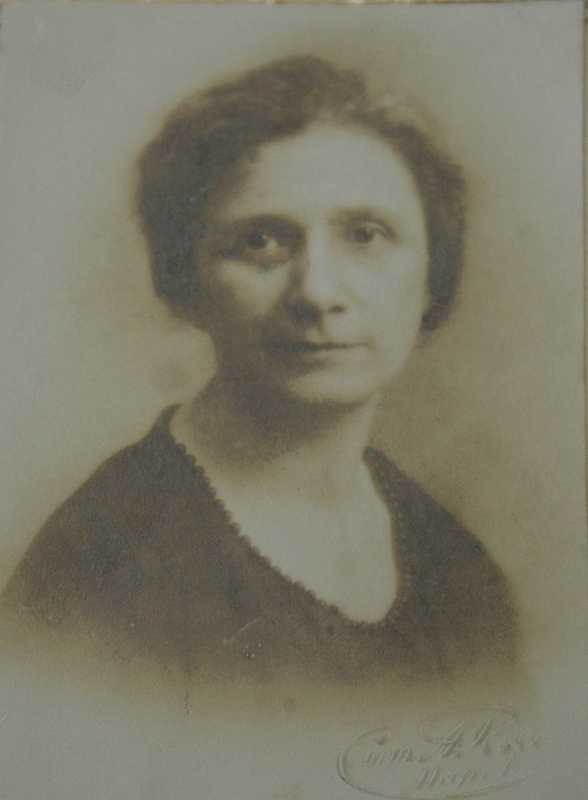
- Maria Bakunin (1895)
- Born: Maria Mikhailovna Bakunina; 2 February 1873; Krasnoyarsk, Russia
- Died: 17 April 1960 (aged 87); Naples, Italy
- Other name: Marussia Bakunin
- Education: University of Naples Federico II
- Spouse: Agostino Oglialoro Todaro
- Scientific career
- Fields: Stereochemistry; Applied chemistry Earth sciences
- Workplaces: Scuola Superiore Politecnica; Accademia Pontaniana

Maria Mikhailovna Bakunina (Russian: Мария Михайловна Бакунина; 2 February 1873 – 17 April 1960) was a Russian-Italian chemist and geologist. Born in Siberia, she moved to southern Italy at a young age, taking up chemistry during her education. By the time of her graduation from the University of Naples, she was already a pioneering figure in stereochemistry and made a number of advancements in applied chemistry. During the early 20th century, she carried out a series of geological surveys in the region of Campania, identifying a number of ichthyol deposits for exploitation. With the outbreak of World War II, she continued her work at the University of Naples and dedicated herself to the rebuilding of the Accademia Pontaniana after the war.

== Early life and education ==
On 2 February 1873, Maria Bakunin was born in the Siberian city of Krasnoyarsk. The third child of Russian anarchist Mikhail Bakunin and Antonia Kwiatkowska, after her father died in 1876, she and her family moved to Naples, where they had local connections. Once she had completed her secondary education, she enrolled in chemistry programme of the University of Naples. By 1890, she was already a preparer at the Chemistry Institute under the direction of Agostino Oglialoro Todaro, who she would later marry. In 1895, she graduated with her degree, having written her thesis on stereochemistry.

== Career ==
Throughout her career, Maria Bakunin carried out important research into indones, from her early studies on the "geometric isomerism of nitrocinnamic and oxy-cinnamic acids", to her later research into "the make-up of picrotoxin, the esterification of phenols [and] the catalyzing effect of certain colloidal solutions in organic syntheses." Her contributions to applied chemistry also resulted in the preparation of a number of medicinal products. Her research was published in the Annali di Chimica Applicata and Gazzetta Chimica Italiana, as well as in the Proceedings of the Società di Scienze, Lettere ed Arti in Naples and the Academy of Science in Bologna.

=== Early work ===
In 1900, Bakunin formulated a novel method for using phosphorus pentoxide in the preparation of idones, anhydrides and ethers. For her work in this field, the famed Italian chemist Stanislao Cannizzaro awarded her with the Neapolitan Academy's prize for physics and mathematics.

In 1902, she attended an applied chemistry conference, which had been convened by the Italian Chemistry Association with the intention of establishing an Italian chemical company. In 1905, Bakunin became a member of the Accademia Pontaniana,

=== Earth sciences ===
In 1906, Bakunin joined a group studying the eruption of Mount Vesuvius, and in 1909, she compiled a geological map of the Italian Peninsula for the Ministry of Education, specifically studying the oil shale and ichthyolic deposits of the mountains of Salerno. That same year, she also went to work teaching applied chemistry at the Scuola Superiore Politecnica in Naples, where in 1912 she became Chair in Applied Technological Chemistry.

Following this, from 1911 until 1930, Bakunin worked as a consultant for local governments and companies interested in industrial development of ichthyol mines in the district of Giffoni. During this period, in 1921, she was elected as the president of the Italian Chemistry Association's branch in Naples. In 1928, she was also appointed by Nicola Parravano to the chemistry and aromatic hydrocarbons commissions of the National Research Council (CNR), although by 1930, these commissions would be dissolved in favour of establishing a commission on combustion fuels.

From 1933 to 1935, she published a series of widely-cited studies in the Gazzetta Chimica Italiana.

=== Later career ===
In 1938, Bakunin prevented her nephew - the anti-fascist mathematician Renato Caccioppoli - from being imprisoned by the Fascist authorities. During World War II, her house was burned down by the Nazis, forcing her to move into an empty hall of the University of Naples, where she was chair of organic chemistry from 1940 to 1947. After the Allied victory, she prevented their forces from militarily occupying the university.

During the post-war reconstruction of Italy, she was on the CNR's chemistry committee. Bakunin also worked with Benedetto Croce to rebuild the Accademia Pontaniana, and in 1944 she was elected its president. In her capacity as president, Bakunin worked with Adolfo Omodeo to restore the Academy's library. She served as president of the academy until 1949.

On 17 April 1960, Bakunin died in her home at the age of 87. In his eulogy to her, Bakunin's pupil Rodolfo A. Nicolaus described her as an "authoritarian but with great charm and prestige", whose personality "added sparkle to the world of chemistry in Naples".

== Bibliography ==
- Ciardi, Marco; Focaccia, Miriam (2011). "Maria Bakunin (1873-1960)". In Apotheker, Jan; Sarkadi, Livia Simon (eds.). European Women in Chemistry. Wiley-VCH. pp. 51–54. ISBN 978-3-527-32956-4. OCLC 804965848.
- Creese, Mary R.S. (2015). "Opening Laboratory Doors: Chemists and Biochemists". Ladies in the Laboratory. Vol. IV. Rowman & Littlefield. pp. 51–53. ISBN 978-1-4422-4742-0. LCCN 2014040495. OCLC 931703206.
- Nicolaus, Rodolfo Alessandro (1988). "Marussia Bakunin". Dizionario Biografico degli Italiani (in Italian). Vol. 34. Rome: Istituto dell'Enciclopedia Italiana. pp. 223–224. OCLC 5894331880.
