= Flat convergence =

In mathematics, flat convergence is a notion for convergence of submanifolds of Euclidean space. It was first introduced by Hassler Whitney in 1957, and then extended to integral currents by Federer and Fleming in 1960. It forms a fundamental part of the field of geometric measure theory. The notion was applied to find solutions to Plateau's problem. In 2001 the notion of an integral current was extended to arbitrary metric spaces by Ambrosio and Kirchheim.

== Integral currents ==
A k-dimensional current T is a linear functional on the space $\Omega^k_c(\mathbb{R}^n)$ of smooth, compactly supported k-forms. For example, given a Lipschitz map from a manifold into Euclidean space, $F: N^k \to \mathbb{R}^n$, one has an integral current T(ω) defined by integrating the pullback of the differential k-form, ω, over N. Currents have a notion of boundary $\partial{T}$ (which is the usual boundary when N is a manifold with boundary) and a notion of mass, M(T), (which is the volume of the image of N). An integer rectifiable current is defined as a countable sum of currents formed in this respect. An integral current is an integer rectifiable current whose boundary has finite mass. It is a deep theorem of Federer-Fleming that the boundary is then also an integral current.

== Flat norm and flat distance ==
The flat norm |T| of a k-dimensional integral current T is the infimum of M(A) + M(B), where the infimum is taken over all integral currents A and B such that $T=A + \partial B$.

The flat distance between two integral currents is then d_{F}(T,S) = |T − S|.

== Compactness theorem ==
Federer-Fleming proved that if one has a sequence of integral currents $T_i$ whose supports lie in a compact set K with a uniform upper bound on $M(T_i) + M(\partial T_i)$, then a subsequence converges in the flat sense to an integral current.

This theorem was applied to study sequences of submanifolds of fixed boundary whose volume approached the infimum over all volumes of submanifolds with the given boundary. It produced a candidate weak solution to Plateau's problem.
