= Geometric integration =

Geometric integration can refer to:

- Homological integration – a method for extending the notion of integral to manifolds.
- Geometric integrator; a numerical method that preserves of geometric properties of the exact flow of a differential equation.
- Geometric integral; several related multiplicative analogues to classical integration.
