= Hausdorff =

Hausdorff may refer to:

== People ==
- Felix Hausdorff (1868–1942), German mathematician after whom Hausdorff spaces are named
- Natasha Hausdorff (born 1989), British barrister, international news commentator, and Israel advocate

== Other ==
- A Hausdorff space, when used as an adjective, as in "the real line is Hausdorff"
- Hausdorff dimension, a measure theoretic concept of dimension
- Hausdorff distance or Hausdorff metric, which measures how far two compact non-empty subsets of a metric space are from each other
- Hausdorff density
- Hausdorff maximal principle
- Hausdorff measure
- Hausdorff moment problem
- Hausdorff paradox
