= Smooth =

Smooth may refer to:

== Mathematics ==
- Smooth function, a function that is infinitely differentiable; used in calculus and topology
- Smooth manifold, a differentiable manifold for which all the transition maps are smooth functions
- Smooth algebraic variety, an algebraic variety with no singular points
- Smooth number, a number whose prime factors are all less than a certain value; used in applications of number theory
- Smoothsort, a sorting algorithm

== Arts and entertainment ==
=== Music ===
- Smooth (singer), Juanita Stokes, American singer, rapper and actress
  - Smooth (Smooth album), 1995
- Smooth (Gerald Albright album), 1994
- "Smooth" (song), by Santana featuring Rob Thomas, 1999
- "Smooth" (Florida Georgia Line song), 2017
- "Smooth", a 2004 song by iiO
- "Smooth", a mashup by Neil Cicierega from Mouth Moods, 2017
- "Smooth", a 2022 song by Yasin
- "Smooth", a song by The Chainsmokers, 2025

=== Other media ===
- Smooth (magazine), an American publication for young black men
- Smooth Radio (disambiguation), UK radio station networks
- Smooth FM, an Australian radio network
- Foxtel Smooth, a defunct Australian pay-television music channel
- Smooth FM (Portugal), a Portuguese radio station

== See also ==
- Surface roughness, the degree to which something is smooth
- Smooth Island (disambiguation)
- Smoother (disambiguation)
- Smoothing (disambiguation)
