= Baby Bottom Butter =

Balm

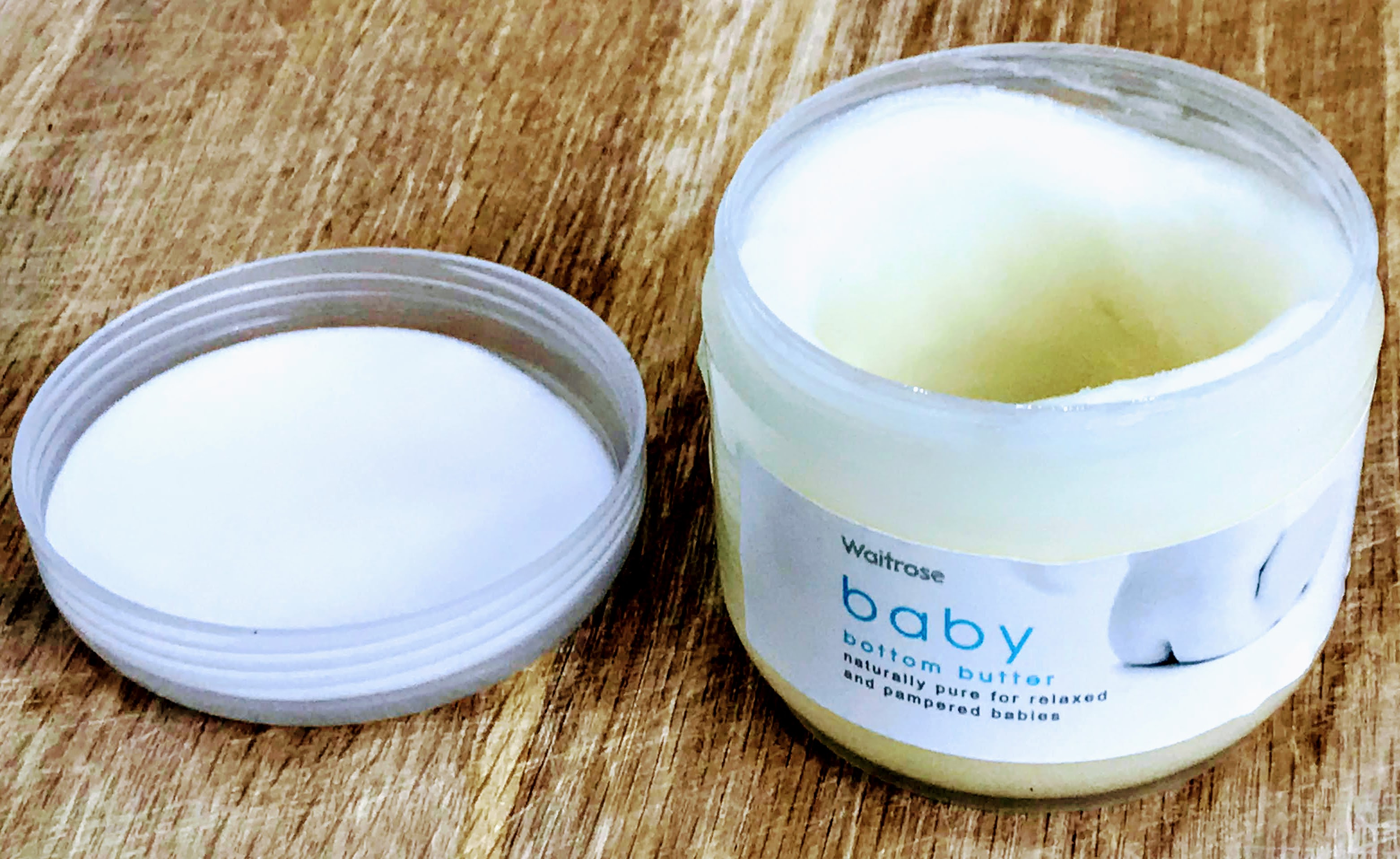

Baby Bottom Butter is a balm sold by English supermarket chain Waitrose, used upon babies' bottoms to soothe them and prevent nappy rash. It is also popular as a face cream for women.

== History ==
The natural ingredients now include olive oil, camomile oil and vanilla. When it was reformulated in 2008 to remove preservative parabens and other petrochemicals, sales increased significantly as mothers started to use it themselves, in place of expensive face cream. As the word spread through parenting websites, with many women praising its softening and firming effect, the product sold out at many stores. In 2008, the product sold eight years worth of stock in just four months following this buzz. Enthusiasm for the balm continued, and in 2011, it was announced to be Waitrose's best-selling skincare product. It is produced in Hampshire.

People living in New Zealand made special arrangement to have it shipped to them and, in 2014, the luxury supermarket chain Nosh started stocking it. In 2016, Waitrose started exporting the product to China.

== See also ==
- Bag Balm
