= Salve =

Medical ointment applied to the surface of the body

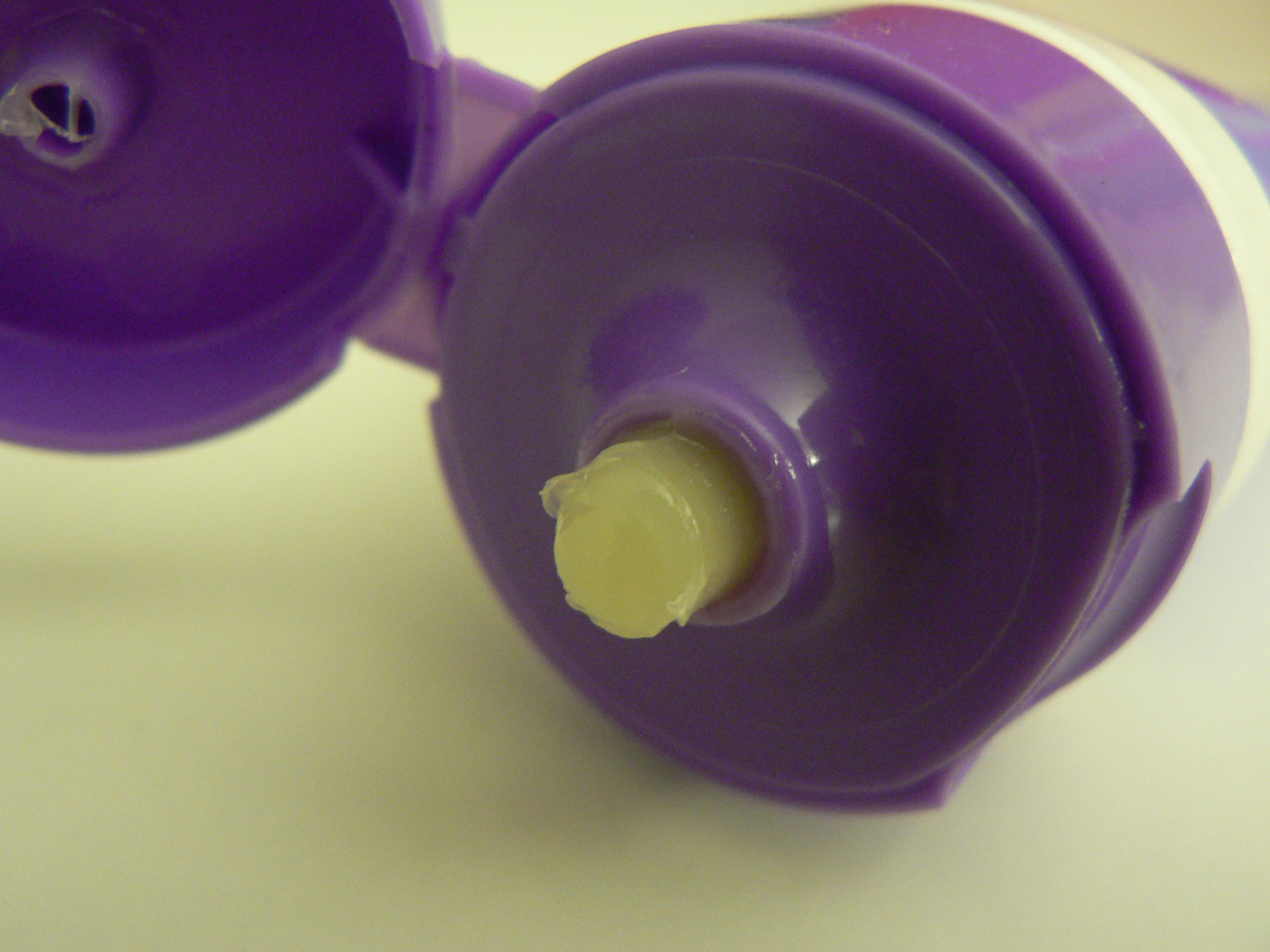
Ointment (salve) from a tube

A salve is a medical ointment used to soothe the skin.

== Medical uses ==
Magnesium sulphate paste is used as a drawing salve to treat small boils and infected wounds and to remove ('draw') small splinters. Black ointment, or Ichthyol Salve, also called Drawing Salve, has been traditionally used to treat minor skin problems such as sebaceous cysts, boils, ingrown toenails and splinters.

The main ingredients are often ichthammol, phenyl alcohol, or Arnica montana, and may contain herbs such as echinacea or calendula. The name comes from archaic belief that an irritant can "draw out" evil humors. (This should not be confused with black salve which is dangerous.)

== Agricultural uses ==
In the days before dipping, a greasy salve was rubbed into the wool of sheep in the autumn as a precautionary measure against parasites - as referenced in social literature about ancient farming areas in England.

== See also ==
- Bag balm
