= Approximate tangent space =

Measure-theoretic generalization of the concept of a tangent space

In geometric measure theory an approximate tangent space is a measure theoretic generalization of the concept of a tangent space for a differentiable manifold.

== Definition ==
In differential geometry the defining characteristic of a tangent space is that it approximates the smooth manifold to first order near the point of tangency. Equivalently, if we zoom in more and more at the point of tangency the manifold appears to become more and more straight, asymptotically tending to approach the tangent space. This turns out to be the correct point of view in geometric measure theory.

=== Definition for sets ===
Definition. Let $M \subset \mathbb{R}^n$ be a set that is measurable with respect to m-dimensional Hausdorff measure $\mathcal{H}^m$, and such that the restriction measure $\mathcal{H}^m \llcorner M$ is a Radon measure. We say that an m-dimensional subspace $P \subset \mathbb{R}^n$ is the approximate tangent space to $M$ at a certain point $x$, denoted $T_x M = P$, if

$\left( \mathcal{H}^m \llcorner M \right)_{x,\lambda} \rightharpoonup \mathcal{H}^m \llcorner P$ as $\lambda \downarrow 0$

in the sense of Radon measures. Here for any measure $\mu$ we denote by $\mu_{x,\lambda}$ the rescaled and translated measure:

$$\mu_{x,\lambda}(A) := \lambda^{-n} \mu(x + \lambda A), \qquad A \subset \mathbb{R}^n$$

Certainly any classical tangent space to a smooth submanifold is an approximate tangent space, but the converse is not necessarily true.

=== Multiplicities ===
The parabola

$$M_1 := \{ (x, x^2) : x \in \mathbb{R} \} \subset \mathbb{R}^2$$

is a smooth 1-dimensional submanifold. Its tangent space at the origin $(0,0) \in M_1$ is the horizontal line $T_{(0,0)} M_1 = \mathbb{R} \times \{0\}$. On the other hand, if we incorporate the reflection along the x-axis:

$$M_2 := \{ (x, x^2) : x \in \mathbb{R} \} \cup \{ (x, -x^2) : x \in \mathbb{R} \} \subset \mathbb{R}^2$$

then $M_2$ is no longer a smooth 1-dimensional submanifold, and there is no classical tangent space at the origin. On the other hand, by zooming in at the origin the set $M_2$ is approximately equal to two straight lines that overlap in the limit. It would be reasonable to say it has an approximate tangent space $\mathbb{R} \times \{0\}$ with multiplicity two.

=== Definition for measures ===
One can generalize the previous definition and proceed to define approximate tangent spaces for certain Radon measures, allowing for multiplicities as explained in the section above.

Definition. Let $\mu$ be a Radon measure on $\mathbb{R}^n$. We say that an m-dimensional subspace $P \subset \mathbb{R}^n$ is the approximate tangent space to $\mu$ at a point $x$ with multiplicity $\theta(x) \in (0,\infty)$, denoted $T_x \mu = P$ with multiplicity $\theta(x)$, if

$\mu_{x,\lambda} \rightharpoonup \theta(x) \; \mathcal{H}^m \llcorner P$ as $\lambda \downarrow 0$

in the sense of Radon measures. The right-hand side is a constant multiple of m-dimensional Hausdorff measure restricted to $P$.

This definition generalizes the one for sets as one can see by taking $\mu := \mathcal{H}^n \llcorner M$ for any $M$ as in that section. It also accounts for the reflected paraboloid example above because for $\mu := \mathcal{H}^1 \llcorner M_2$ we have $T_{(0,0)} \mu = \mathbb{R} \times \{0\}$ with multiplicity two.

== Relation to rectifiable sets ==
The notion of approximate tangent spaces is very closely related to that of rectifiable sets. Loosely speaking, rectifiable sets are precisely those for which approximate tangent spaces exist almost everywhere. The following lemma encapsulates this relationship:

Lemma. Let $M \subset \mathbb{R}^n$ be measurable with respect to m-dimensional Hausdorff measure. Then $M$ is m-rectifiable if and only if there exists a positive locally $\mathcal{H}^m$-integrable function $\theta : M \to (0,\infty)$ such that the Radon measure

$$\mu(A) = \int_A \theta(x) \, d\mathcal{H}^m(x)$$

has approximate tangent spaces $T_x \mu$ for $\mathcal{H}^m$-almost every $x \in M$.
