= Area formula (geometric measure theory) =

Area formula from geometric measure theory

In geometric measure theory the area formula relates the Hausdorff measure of the image of a Lipschitz map, while accounting for multiplicity, to the integral of the Jacobian of the map. It is one of the fundamental results of the field that has connections, for example, to rectifiability and Sard's theorem.

Definition: Given $f\colon \mathbb{R}^n \to \mathbb{R}^m$ and $A\subset \mathbb{R}^n$, the multiplicity function $N(f,A,y), \, y\in \mathbb{R}^m$, is the (possibly infinite) number of points in the preimage $f^{-1}(y)\cap A$. The multiplicity function is also called the Banach indicatrix. Note that $N(f,A,y) = \mathcal{H}^0(f^{-1}(y)\cap A)$. Here, $\mathcal{H}^n$ denotes the n-dimensional Hausdorff measure, and $\mathcal{L}^n$ will denote the n-dimensional Lebesgue measure.

Theorem: If $f\colon \mathbb{R}^n \to \mathbb{R}^m$ is Lipschitz and $n\leq m$, then for any measurable $A\subset \mathbb{R}^n$, $\int_A {J}(Df(x))\, d \mathcal{L}^n(x) = \int_{\mathbb{R}^m} N(f,A,y) \, d\mathcal{H}^n(y) \, ,$ where ${J}(Df(x))=\sqrt{\det(Df(x)^tDf(x))}$ is the Jacobian of $Df(x)$.

The measurability of the multiplicity function is part of the claim. The Jacobian is defined almost everywhere by Rademacher's differentiability theorem.

The theorem was proved first by Herbert Federer (Federer 1969).

== Sources ==
- Ambrosio, Luigi; Fusco, Nicola; Pallara, Diego (2000). Functions of bounded variation and free discontinuity problems. Oxford Mathematical Monographs. New York: The Clarendon Press. ISBN 0-19-850245-1. MR 1857292. Zbl 0957.49001.
- Evans, Lawrence C.; Gariepy, Ronald F. (2015). Measure theory and fine properties of functions. Textbooks in Mathematics (Revised edition of 1992 original ed.). Boca Raton, FL: CRC Press. doi:10.1201/b18333. ISBN 978-1-4822-4238-6. MR 3409135. Zbl 1310.28001.
- Federer, Herbert (1969). Geometric measure theory. Die Grundlehren der mathematischen Wissenschaften. Vol. 153. Berlin–Heidelberg–New York: Springer-Verlag. doi:10.1007/978-3-642-62010-2. ISBN 978-3-540-60656-7. MR 0257325. Zbl 0176.00801.
- Simon, Leon (1983). Lectures on geometric measure theory (PDF). Proceedings of the Centre for Mathematical Analysis, Australian National University. Vol. 3. Canberra: Australian National University, Centre for Mathematical Analysis. ISBN 0-86784-429-9. MR 0756417. Zbl 0546.49019.
