= Smoothing (disambiguation) =

Smoothing is the reduction or elimination in the roughness or unevenness of a surface or other thing.

Smoothing may refer to:

- Smoothing, a type of statistical technique for handling data
- Smoothing (phonetics)
- Image smoothing
- Relaxation (iterative method), iterative smoothing of solutions and errors in computational science
- The Smoothing problem in stochastic processes. See Smoothing problem (stochastic processes)

== See also ==
- Smooth (disambiguation)
- Polishing
