= Homological integration =

Mathematics concept

In the mathematical fields of differential geometry and geometric measure theory, homological integration or geometric integration is a method for extending the notion of the integral to manifolds. Rather than functions or differential forms, the integral is defined over currents on a manifold.

The theory is "homological" because currents themselves are defined by duality with differential forms. To wit, the space D^{k} of k-currents on a manifold M is defined as the dual space, in the sense of distributions, of the space of k-forms Ω^{k} on M. Thus there is a pairing between k-currents T and k-forms α, denoted here by

$$\langle T, \alpha\rangle.$$

Under this duality pairing, the exterior derivative

$$d : \Omega^{k-1} \to \Omega^k$$

goes over to a boundary operator

$$\partial : D^k \to D^{k-1}$$

defined by

$$\langle\partial T,\alpha\rangle = \langle T, d\alpha\rangle$$

for all α ∈ Ω^{k}. This is a homological rather than cohomological construction.
