= Bag Balm =

Salve to soothe irritated udders after milking

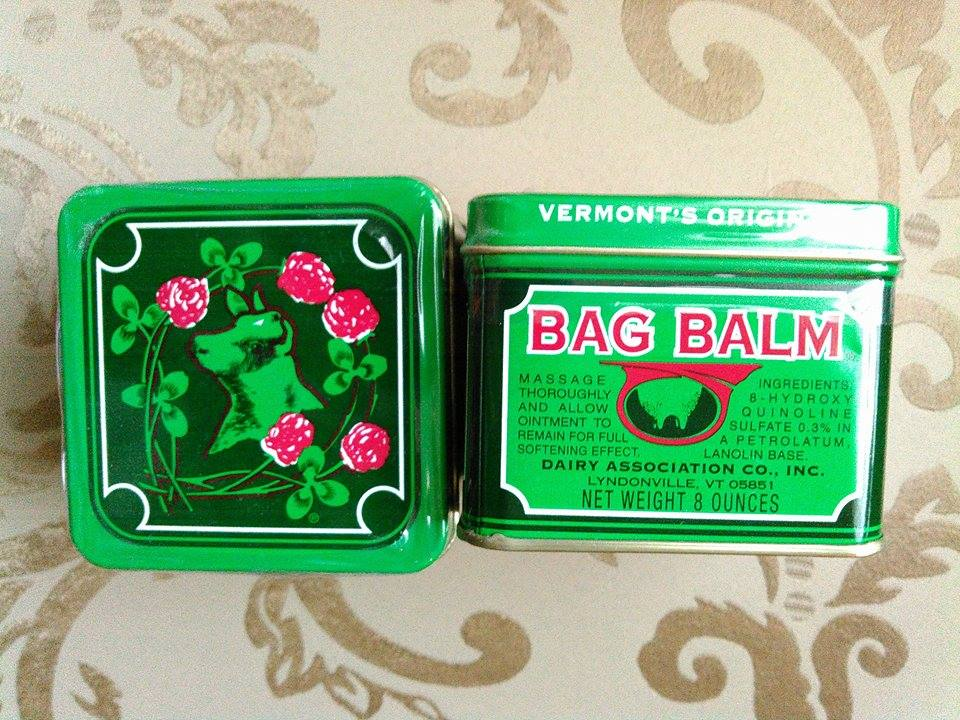
Bag Balm

Bag Balm is a salve developed in 1899 to soothe irritation on cows' udders after milking. Bag Balm is also widely used to soothe dry, cracked skin on humans.

== Uses ==
It is used as a treatment for chapped and irritated skin on humans and can be found in places such as drugstores, ski resorts, online vendors, and needlework stores, in addition to farm and feed stores. Its uses are claimed to be many, for example: "squeaky bed springs, psoriasis, dry facial skin, cracked fingers, burns, zits, diaper rash, saddle sores, sunburn, pruned trees, rifles, shell casings, bedsores and radiation burns." Bag Balm is also used as a lip balm.

== History ==
For the first 115 years, Bag Balm was made by a Vermont family-owned business called Dairy Association Co. Inc. In 2014, the family sold the business to a group of investors who changed the name of the company to Vermont's Original, LLC. At the time of the sale, the company had seven employees and was located in Lyndonville, Vermont, and Rock Island, Quebec.

The Bag Balm product is known for its characteristic 8-oz green square tins featuring a cow's head and red clovers on the lid. It has been in production since 1899. The formula was purchased by John L. Norris from a Wells River, Vermont, druggist sometime before the turn of the century. Originally, it was used for only cows' udders, but farmers' wives noticed the softness of their husbands' hands, and started using the product themselves. Imitators include Udderly Smooth Udder Cream and Udder Balm. In a 1983 report, Charles Kuralt reported on CBS that "upward of 400,000 units were shipped annually"; more recent sales figures are not disclosed by the company.

Bag Balm was taken to the North Pole by Richard E. Byrd, and was used by Allied troops in World War II to protect weapons from rust. It was used at the World Trade Center site in New York after the September 11 attacks on the paws of cadaver dogs, and it has been used by American troops in the wars in Iraq and Afghanistan.

== Makeup ==
The active ingredients of Bag Balm are 8-hydroxyquinoline sulfate 0.3% (antiseptic) in a petroleum jelly USP and lanolin base.

In the past, Bag Balm has been documented as containing 0.005% ethylmercury. Mercury was once used in many products as an effective antiseptic, although much less commonly today, now that the toxic effects of ethylmercury and its compounds are more widely understood. Mercury is no longer listed as an ingredient in Bag Balm.

== See also ==
- Baby Bottom Butter
