= Current (mathematics) =

Distributions on spaces of differential forms

In mathematics, more particularly in functional analysis, differential topology, and geometric measure theory, a k-current in the sense of Georges de Rham is a functional on the space of compactly supported differential k-forms, on a smooth manifold M. Currents formally behave like Schwartz distributions on a space of differential forms, but in a geometric setting, they can represent integration over a submanifold, generalizing the Dirac delta function, or more generally even directional derivatives of delta functions (multipoles) spread out along subsets of M.

== Definition ==
Let $\Omega_c^m(M)$ denote the space of smooth m-forms with compact support on a smooth manifold $M.$ A current is a linear functional on $\Omega_c^m(M)$ which is continuous in the sense of distributions. Thus a linear functional $T : \Omega_c^m(M)\to \R$ is an m-dimensional current if it is continuous in the following sense: If a sequence $\omega_k$ of smooth forms, all supported in the same compact set, is such that all derivatives of all their coefficients tend uniformly to 0 when $k$ tends to infinity, then $T(\omega_k)$ tends to 0.

The space $\mathcal D_m(M)$ of m-dimensional currents on $M$ is a real vector space with operations defined by $(T+S)(\omega) := T(\omega)+S(\omega),\qquad (\lambda T)(\omega) := \lambda T(\omega).$

Much of the theory of distributions carries over to currents with minimal adjustments. For example, one may define the support of a current $T \in \mathcal{D}_m(M)$ as the complement of the biggest open set $U \subset M$ such that $T(\omega) = 0$ whenever $\omega \in \Omega_c^m(U)$

The linear subspace of $\mathcal D_m(M)$ consisting of currents with support (in the sense above) that is a compact subset of $M$ is denoted $\mathcal E_m(M).$

== Homological theory ==
Integration over a compact rectifiable oriented submanifold M (with boundary) of dimension m defines an m-current, denoted by $[[M]]$: $[[M]](\omega)=\int_M \omega.$

If the boundary ∂M of M is rectifiable, then it too defines a current by integration, and by virtue of Stokes' theorem one has: $[[\partial M]](\omega) = \int_{\partial M}\omega = \int_M d\omega = [[M]](d\omega).$

This relates the exterior derivative d with the boundary operator ∂ on the homology of M.

In view of this formula we can define a boundary operator on arbitrary currents $\partial : \mathcal D_{m+1} \to \mathcal D_m$ via duality with the exterior derivative by $(\partial T)(\omega) := T(d\omega)$ for all compactly supported m-forms $\omega.$

Certain subclasses of currents which are closed under $\partial$ can be used instead of all currents to create a homology theory, which can satisfy the Eilenberg–Steenrod axioms in certain cases. A classical example is the subclass of integral currents on Lipschitz neighborhood retracts.

== Topology and norms ==
The space of currents is naturally endowed with the weak-* topology, which will be further simply called weak convergence. A sequence $T_k$ of currents, converges to a current $T$ if $T_k(\omega) \to T(\omega),\qquad \forall \omega.$

It is possible to define several norms on subspaces of the space of all currents. One such norm is the mass norm. If $\omega$ is an m-form, then define its comass by $\|\omega\| := \sup\{\left|\langle \omega,\xi\rangle\right| : \xi \mbox{ is a unit, simple, }m\mbox{-vector}\}.$

So if $\omega$ is a simple m-form, then its mass norm is the usual L^{∞}-norm of its coefficient. The mass of a current $T$ is then defined as $\mathbf M (T) := \sup\{ T(\omega) : \sup_x |\vert\omega(x)|\vert\le 1\}.$

The mass of a current represents the weighted area of the generalized surface. A current such that M(T) < ∞ is representable by integration of a regular Borel measure by a version of the Riesz representation theorem. This is the starting point of homological integration.

An intermediate norm is Whitney's flat norm, defined by $\mathbf F (T) := \inf \{\mathbf M(T - \partial A) + \mathbf M(A) : A\in\mathcal E_{m+1}\}.$

Two currents are close in the mass norm if they coincide away from a small part. On the other hand, they are close in the flat norm if they coincide up to a small deformation.

== Examples ==
Recall that $\Omega_c^0(\R^n)\equiv C^\infty_c(\R^n)$ so that the following defines a 0-current: $T(f) = f(0).$

In particular every signed regular measure $\mu$ is a 0-current: $T(f) = \int f(x)\, d\mu(x).$

Let (x, y, z) be the coordinates in $\R^3.$ Then the following defines a 2-current (one of many): $T(a\,dx\wedge dy + b\,dy\wedge dz + c\,dx\wedge dz) := \int_0^1 \int_0^1 b(x,y,0)\, dx \, dy.$

== See also ==
- Georges de Rham
- Herbert Federer
- Differential geometry
- Varifold
