= Hausdorff density =

In measure theory, a field of mathematics, the Hausdorff density measures how concentrated a Radon measure is at some point.

== Definition ==
Let $\mu$ be a Radon measure and $a\in\mathbb{R}^{n}$ some point in Euclidean space. The s-dimensional upper and lower Hausdorff densities are defined to be, respectively,

$$\Theta^{*s}(\mu,a)=\limsup_{r\rightarrow 0}\frac{\mu(B_{r}(a))}{r^{s}}$$

and

$$\Theta_{*}^{s}(\mu,a)=\liminf_{r\rightarrow 0}\frac{\mu(B_{r}(a))}{r^{s}}$$

where $B_{r}(a)$ is the ball of radius r > 0 centered at a. Clearly, $\Theta_{*}^{s}(\mu,a)\leq \Theta^{*s}(\mu,a)$ for all $a\in\mathbb{R}^{n}$. In the event that the two are equal, we call their common value the s-density of $\mu$ at a and denote it $\Theta^{s}(\mu,a)$.

== Marstrand's theorem ==
The following theorem states that the times when the s-density exists are rather seldom.

Marstrand's theorem: Let $\mu$ be a Radon measure on $\mathbb{R}^{d}$. Suppose that the s-density $\Theta^{s}(\mu,a)$ exists and is positive and finite for a in a set of positive $\mu$ measure. Then s is an integer.

== Preiss' theorem ==
In 1987 David Preiss proved a stronger version of Marstrand's theorem. One consequence is that sets with positive and finite density are rectifiable sets.

Preiss' theorem: Let $\mu$ be a Radon measure on $\mathbb{R}^{d}$. Suppose that m$\geq 1$ is an integer and the m-density $\Theta^{m}(\mu,a)$ exists and is positive and finite for $\mu$ almost every a in the support of $\mu$. Then $\mu$ is m-rectifiable, i.e. $\mu\ll H^{m}$ ($\mu$ is absolutely continuous with respect to Hausdorff measure $H^m$) and the support of $\mu$ is an m-rectifiable set.
