= Smoother =

Smoother may refer to:

- Kernel smoother, a statistical technique
- Smoother (statistics), another statistical technique
- Smoother (band), a Canadian rock band

== See also ==
- Asphyxia (smother)
