= Renato Caccioppoli =

Italian mathematician (1904–1959)

- Born: 20 January 1904; Naples, Kingdom of Italy
- Died: 8 May 1959 (aged 55); Naples, Italy
- Education: University of Naples Federico II
- Known for: Caccioppoli set
- Scientific career
- Fields: Functional analysis; Geometric measure theory; Several complex variables; Partial differential equations
- Workplaces: University of Naples Federico II; University of Padua
- Doctoral advisor: Mauro Picone
- Doctoral students: Federico Cafiero; Guido Stampacchia

Renato Caccioppoli (Italian: [reˈnaːto katˈtʃɔppoli]; 20 January 1904 – 8 May 1959) was an Italian mathematician, known for his contributions to mathematical analysis, including the theory of functions of several complex variables, functional analysis, measure theory.

== Life and career ==
Born in Naples, he was the son of Giuseppe Caccioppoli (1852–1947), a surgeon, and his second wife Sofia Bakunin (1870–1956), daughter of the Russian revolutionary Mikhail Bakunin. After earning his high-school diploma in 1921, he enrolled in the Department of engineering to swap to mathematics in November 1923. Immediately after earning his laurea in 1925, he became the assistant of Mauro Picone, who in that year was called to the University of Naples, where he remained until 1932. Picone immediately discovered Caccioppoli's brilliance and pointed him towards research in mathematical analysis. During the following five years, Caccioppoli published about 30 works on topics developed in the complete autonomy provided by a ministerial award for mathematics in 1931, a competition he won at the age of 27 and the chair of algebraic analysis at the University of Padua. In 1934 he returned to Naples to accept the chair in group theory; later he took the chair of superior analysis, and from 1943 onwards, the chair in mathematical analysis.

In 1931 he became a correspondent member of the Academy of Physical and Mathematical Sciences of Naples, becoming an ordinary member in 1938. In 1944 he became an ordinary member of the Accademia Pontaniana, and in 1947 a correspondent member of the Accademia Nazionale dei Lincei, and a national member in 1958. He was also a correspondent member of the Paduan Academy of Sciences, Letters, and Arts. In the years from 1947 to 1957, he directed, together with Carlo Miranda, the journal Giornale di Matematiche, founded by Giuseppe Battaglini. In 1948 he became a member of the editing committee of Annali di Matematica, and starting in 1952 he was also a member of the editing committee of Ricerche di Matematica. In 1953 the Academia dei Lincei bestowed on him the national prize of physical, mathematical, and natural sciences.

He was an excellent pianist, noted as well for his nonconformist temperament. He tried out the vagrant life, and was arrested for begging. In May 1938 he gave a speech against Adolf Hitler and Benito Mussolini, when the latter was visiting Naples. Together with his companion Sara Mancuso, he had the French national anthem played by an orchestra, after which he began to speak against fascism and Nazism in the presence of OVRA agents. He was again arrested, but his aunt, Maria Bakunin, who at the time was a professor of chemistry at the University of Naples, succeeded in having him released by convincing the authorities that her nephew was non compos mentis. Thus Caccioppoli was interned, but he continued his studies in mathematics, and playing the piano.

In his last years, the disappointments of politics and his wife's desertion, together perhaps with the weakening of his mathematical vein, pushed him into alcoholism. His growing instability had sharpened his "strangenesses", to the point that the news of his suicide on May 8, 1959, by a headshot did not surprise those who knew him. He died at his home in Palazzo Cellamare.

== Work ==
His most important works, out of a total of around eighty publications, relate to functional analysis and the calculus of variations. Beginning in 1930 he dedicated himself to the study of differential equations, the first to use a topological-functional approach. Proceeding in this way, in 1931 he extended the Brouwer fixed point theorem, applying the results obtained both from ordinary differential equations and partial differential equations.

In 1932 he introduced the general concept of inversion of functional correspondence, showing that a transformation between two Banach spaces is invertible only if it is locally invertible and if the only convergent sequences are the compact ones.

Between 1933 and 1938 he applied his results to elliptic equations, establishing the majorizing limits for their solutions, generalizing the two-dimensional case of Felix Bernstein. At the same time he studied analytic functions of several complex variables, that is, analytic functions whose domain belongs to the vector space C^{n}, proving in 1933 the fundamental theorem on normal families of such functions: if a family is normal with respect to every complex variable, it is also normal with respect to the set of the variables. He also proved a logarithmic residue formula for functions of two complex variables in 1949.

In 1935 Caccioppoli proved the analyticity of class C^{2} solutions of elliptic equations with analytic coefficients.

The year 1952 saw the publication of his masterwork on the area of a surface and measure theory, the article Measure and integration of dimensionally oriented sets (Misura e integrazione degli insiemi dimensionalmente orientati, Rendiconti dell'Accademia Nazionale dei Lincei, s. VIII, v.12). The article is mainly concerned with the theory of dimensionally oriented sets; that is, an interpretation of surfaces as oriented boundaries of sets in space. Also in this paper, the family of sets approximable by polygonal domains of finite perimeter, known today as Caccioppoli sets or sets of finite perimeter, was introduced and studied.

His last works, produced between 1952 and 1953, deal with a class of pseudoanalytic functions, introduced by him to extend certain properties of analytic functions.

== Legacy ==
In 1992 his tormented personality inspired the plot of a film directed by Mario Martone, Morte di un matematico napoletano (The Death of a Neapolitan Mathematician), in which he was portrayed by Carlo Cecchi.

An asteroid, 9934 Caccioppoli, has been named after him.

== Selected publications ==
- Caccioppoli, Renato (1963), Opere scelte, Rome: Edizioni Cremonese (distributed by Unione Matematica Italiana), Zbl 0112.28201 ISBN 88-7083-505-7 (Volume 1) AND ISBN 88-7083-506-5 (Volume 2). His "Selected works", a selection from Caccioppoli's scientific works with a biography and a commentary.

== See also ==
- Contraction principle
- Caccioppoli set
- Weyl's inequality
