= Smooth Island =

Smooth Island may refer to:

- Smooth Island (Antarctica)
- Smooth Island (Tasmania), Australia
- Smooth Island (South Australia)
- Smooth Island (Ontario), Canada
