= Ammonium bituminosulfonate =

Chemical compound

Ichthammol
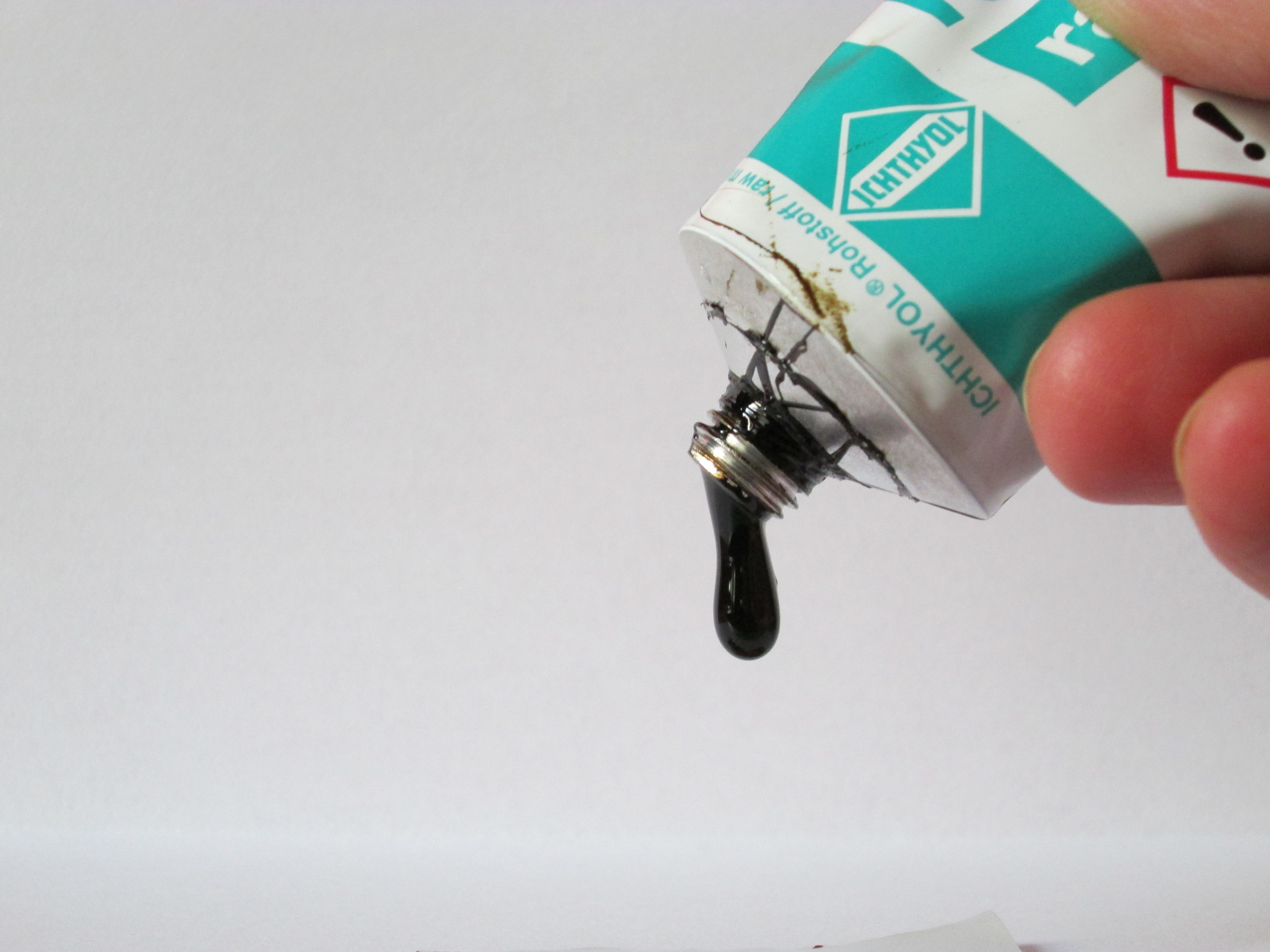
- A tube of medicinal ammonium bituminosulfonate (ichthyol)

Clinical data
- Trade names: Ichthyol
- Other names: ammonium bituminosulfonate; ammonium bituminosulphonate; bituminosulfonates

Identifiers
- CAS Number: 8029-68-3
- DrugBank: DB11341
- UNII: NQ14646378
- CompTox Dashboard (EPA): DTXSID1025439
- ECHA InfoCard: 100.029.485

Ichthammol or ammonium bituminosulfonate (brand name Ichthyol), also known as black ointment, is a medication derived from sulfur-rich oil shale (bituminous schists). It is used (sometimes in combination with zinc oxide) as a treatment for different skin diseases, including eczema and psoriasis (see below). It is applied on the skin as an ointment, most commonly containing 10% or 20% ichthammol.

Bituminosulfonates are considered topical therapeutic agents with very good tolerability.

The use of ichthammol in dermatology was promoted by German physician Paul Gerson Unna.

Ichthammol ointments, commonly known as black ointment or drawing salve, should not be confused with black salve, an escharotic (corrosive) paste intended to destroy skin tissue. In contrast, ichthammol does not have any corrosive properties on the skin.

== Production ==
Ichthammol is obtained through three steps from bituminous schists: dry distillation, sulfonation of the resulting oil (or purified fractions thereof), and finally neutralization with ammonia.

== Properties ==
Ichthammol is a viscous, water-soluble substance with a characteristic bitumen-like odor. It is incompatible with acids, alkali carbonates or hydrates and alkaloidal salts. It is a thick reddish brown liquid, possessing a bituminous odor and taste. It is soluble in water and miscible with glycerin, but is nearly insoluble in strong alcohol or concentrated ether. It contains a large percentage of organically combined sulfur.

Chemically speaking ichthammol is a sulfonated shale oil. From elemental analysis, the composition of ichthammol was calculated to be C_{28}H_{36}S_{5}O_{6}(NH_{4})_{2}. However, as a product of natural origin, it is a mixture of many different compounds.

== Similar materials ==
Similar substances can be made by altering the starting material. An "ammonium sufobitol" (Tumenol-Ammonium), made from light shale oil of the Messel pit, was sold until 2000 in Germany. The Chinese material labelled as "ichthammol" are actually an ersatz product made from vegetable oil.

=== Ichtasol ===
Ichtasol
Clinical data
- Trade names: Ichthyol-Pale
- Other names: sodium shale oil sulfonate (former INCI); Ichthyolic Acid, Sodium Salt; sodium salt of light bitumenosulfonate
- ATC code: D10BX01 (WHO)

Identifiers
- CAS Number: 12542-33-5 1340-06-3 (cosmetic-grade)
- DrugBank: DB11341
- UNII: NQ14646378
- KEGG: D04495
- ECHA InfoCard: 100.029.485

Ichtasol (USAN: Ictasol) is produced from the light (as opposed to heavy) fraction of distilled shale oil. It has a pale appearance. There appears to be an oral preparation made from this mixture.

=== Chinese vegetable oil product ===
"Ichthammol" (鱼石脂 Yushizhi) made in China does not meet standards for ichthammol as specified in United States Pharmacopoeia (USP), European Pharmacopoeia (Ph.Eur), or for the CAS number. Instead of requiring bituminous schists like these definitions, the Chinese Pharmacopoeia definition for "ichthammol" uses ordinary vegetable oil:

Ichthammol is a mixture obtained by sulfurization of vegetable oils (soybean oil, tung oil, corn oil, etc.), sulfonation, and neutralization with ammonia. Organic sulfur content ≥ 5.5%, ammonium content ≥ 2.5%. — Chinese definition according to ChP 10

As a result, Chinese "ichthammol" is very different from standard ichthammol. The characteristic bitumen-like odor (originating from the bituminous source material) is missing with Chinese material.

== Medical use ==
=== Skin disorders ===
It is used to treat a variety of skin disorders as e.g. eczema, psoriasis, Acne rosacea and acne.

According to the "list of preferred Specials" by the British Association of Dermatologists (BAD) ichthammol can be used in dermatology prescribing to treat acutely inflamed atopic eczema, among others. A corresponding recommendation exists for bituminosulfonates in Germany. According to "guideline atopic eczema" bituminosulfonates can be considered for treatment of atopic eczema based on general clinic experience. In the European Dermatology Forum (EDF) guidelines for treatment of atopic eczema ichthammol is recommended as a useful addition to the basic treatment regimen, especially in mild disease or if TCS treatment is not possible from a patient's perspective, e.g. corticophobia (steroid phobia).

=== Ear infections ===
In otology, a mixture of glycerol and ichthammol (G & I) is used for the topical treatment of ear infections. It is effective against Gram-positive bacteria. The anti-inflammatory action is explained by its influence on the formation, secretion, and effect of inflammation mediators.

== Availability ==
Ichthammol is available in pharmacies for compounding medications. Different sources of information exist for exemplary formulations (creams, shake lotions, suppositories, etc.).

== Pharmacology ==
Ichthammol has anti-inflammatory, bactericidal, and fungicidal properties.

== Veterinary use ==
The European Medicines Agency published a summary report on ichthyol-substances (synonym: bituminosulfonates) during the course of the European Maximum Residue Limits (MRL) procedure in veterinary medicine. The Committee for Medicinal Products for Veterinary Use (CVMP) decided that due to good tolerance and safety, there is no need to establish an MRL for ichthyol-substances. As a result, ichthyol-substances can be applied topically in all mammalian food-producing species without restriction.

== See also ==
- Coal tar
- Pine tar
