= Rectifiable set =

Mathematics concept

In mathematics, a rectifiable set is a set that is smooth in a certain measure-theoretic sense. It is an extension of the idea of a rectifiable curve to higher dimensions; loosely speaking, a rectifiable set is a rigorous formulation of a piece-wise smooth set. As such, it has many of the desirable properties of smooth manifolds, including tangent spaces that are defined almost everywhere. Rectifiable sets are the underlying object of study in geometric measure theory.

== Definition ==
A Borel subset $E$ of Euclidean space $\mathbb{R}^n$ is said to be $m$-rectifiable set if $E$ is of Hausdorff dimension $m$, and there exist a countable collection $\{f_i\}$ of continuously differentiable maps

$$f_i:\mathbb{R}^m \to \mathbb{R}^n$$

such that the $m$-Hausdorff measure $\mathcal{H}^m$ of

$$E\setminus \bigcup_{i=0}^\infty f_i\left(\mathbb{R}^m\right)$$

is zero. The backslash here denotes the set difference. Equivalently, the $f_i$ may be taken to be Lipschitz continuous without altering the definition. Other authors have different definitions, for example, not requiring $E$ to be $m$-dimensional, but instead requiring that $E$ is a countable union of sets which are the image of a Lipschitz map from some bounded subset of $\mathbb{R}^m$.

A set $E$ is said to be purely $m$-unrectifiable if for every (continuous, differentiable) $f:\mathbb{R}^m \to \mathbb{R}^n$, one has

$$\mathcal{H}^m \left(E \cap f\left(\mathbb{R}^m\right)\right)=0.$$

A standard example of a purely-1-unrectifiable set in two dimensions is the Cartesian product of the Smith–Volterra–Cantor set times itself.

=== Rectifiable sets in metric spaces ===
Federer (1969, pp. 251–252) gives the following terminology for m-rectifiable sets E in a general metric space X.

1. E is $m$ rectifiable when there exists a Lipschitz map $f:K \to E$ for some bounded subset $K$ of $\mathbb{R}^m$ onto $E$.
2. E is countably $m$ rectifiable when E equals the union of a countable family of $m$ rectifiable sets.
3. E is countably $(\phi,m)$ rectifiable when $\phi$ is a measure on X and there is a countably $m$ rectifiable set F such that $\phi(E\setminus F)=0$.
4. E is $(\phi,m)$ rectifiable when E is countably $(\phi,m)$ rectifiable and $\phi(E)<\infty$
5. E is purely $(\phi,m)$ unrectifiable when $\phi$ is a measure on X and E includes no $m$ rectifiable set F with $\phi(F)>0$.

Definition 3 with $\phi=\mathcal{H}^m$ and $X=\mathbb{R}^n$ comes closest to the above definition for subsets of Euclidean spaces.
