= Coarea formula =

Mathematical formula

In the mathematical field of geometric measure theory, the coarea formula expresses the integral of a function over an open set in Euclidean space in terms of integrals over the level sets of another function. A special case is Fubini's theorem, which says under suitable hypotheses that the integral of a function over the region enclosed by a rectangular box can be written as the iterated integral over the level sets of the coordinate functions. Another special case is integration in spherical coordinates, in which the integral of a function on R^{n} is related to the integral of the function over spherical shells: level sets of the radial function. The formula plays a decisive role in the modern study of isoperimetric problems.

For smooth functions the formula is a result in multivariate calculus which follows from a change of variables. More general forms of the formula for Lipschitz functions were first established by Herbert Federer (Federer 1959), and for BV functions by Fleming & Rishel (1960).

A precise statement of the formula is as follows. Suppose that Ω is an open set in $\R^n$ and u is a real-valued Lipschitz function on Ω. Then, for an L^{1} function g,

$$\int_\Omega g(x) |\nabla u(x)|\, dx = \int_{\R} \left(\int_{u^{-1}(t)}g(x)\,dH_{n-1}(x)\right)\,dt$$

where H_{n−1} is the (n − 1)-dimensional Hausdorff measure. In particular, by taking g to be one, this implies

$$\int_\Omega |\nabla u| = \int_{-\infty}^\infty H_{n-1}(u^{-1}(t))\,dt,$$

and conversely the latter equality implies the former by standard techniques in Lebesgue integration.

More generally, the coarea formula can be applied to Lipschitz functions u defined in $\Omega \subset \R^n,$ taking on values in $\R^k$ where k ≤ n. In this case, the following identity holds

$$\int_\Omega g(x) |J_k u(x)|\, dx = \int_{\R^k} \left(\int_{u^{-1}(t)}g(x)\,dH_{n-k}(x)\right)\,dt$$

where J_{k}u is the k-dimensional Jacobian of u whose determinant is given by

$$|J_k u(x)| = \left({\det\left(J u(x) J u(x)^\intercal\right)}\right)^{1/2}.$$

== Applications ==
- Taking u(x) = |x − x_{0}| gives the formula for integration in spherical coordinates of an integrable function f:

$$\int_{\R^n}f\,dx = \int_0^\infty\left\{\int_{\partial B(x_0;r)} f\,dS\right\}\,dr.$$

- Combining the coarea formula with the isoperimetric inequality gives a proof of the Sobolev inequality for W^{1,1} with best constant:

$$\left(\int_{\R^n} |u|^{\frac{n}{n-1}}\right)^{\frac{n-1}{n}}\le n^{-1}\omega_n^{-\frac{1}{n}}\int_{\R^n}|\nabla u|$$

where $\omega_n$ is the volume of the unit ball in $\R^n.$

== See also ==
- Sard's theorem
- Smooth coarea formula
