= Order of integration (calculus) =

Order in which multiple or iterated integrals are computed

In calculus, interchange of the order of integration is a methodology that transforms iterated integrals (or multiple integrals through the use of Fubini's theorem) of functions into other, hopefully simpler, integrals by changing the order in which the integrations are performed. In some cases, the order of integration can be validly interchanged; in others it cannot.

== Problem statement ==
The problem for examination is evaluation of an integral of the form

$$\iint_D \ f(x,y ) \ dx \,dy ,$$

where D is some two-dimensional area in the xy–plane. For some functions f straightforward integration is feasible, but where that is not true, the integral can sometimes be reduced to simpler form by changing the order of integration. The difficulty with this interchange is determining the change in description of the domain D.

The method also is applicable to other multiple integrals.

Sometimes, even though a full evaluation is difficult, or perhaps requires a numerical integration, a double integral can be reduced to a single integration, as illustrated next. Reduction to a single integration makes a numerical evaluation much easier and more efficient.

== Relation to integration by parts ==
Figure 1: Integration over the triangular area can be done using vertical or horizontal strips as the first step. This is an overhead view, looking down the z-axis onto the xy-plane. The sloped line is the curve y = x.

Consider the iterated integral

$$\int_a^z \, \int_a^x \, h(y) \, dy \, dx ,$$

In this expression, the second integral is calculated first with respect to y and x is held constant—a strip of width dx is integrated first over the y-direction (a strip of width dx in the x direction is integrated with respect to the y variable across the y direction), adding up an infinite amount of rectangles of width dy along the y-axis. This forms a three dimensional slice dx wide along the x-axis, from y=a to y=x along the y-axis, and in the z direction z=h(y). Notice that if the thickness dx is infinitesimal, x varies only infinitesimally on the slice. We can assume that x is constant. This integration is as shown in the left panel of Figure 1, but is inconvenient especially when the function h(y) is not easily integrated. The integral can be reduced to a single integration by reversing the order of integration as shown in the right panel of the figure. To accomplish this interchange of variables, the strip of width dy is first integrated from the line x = y to the limit x = z, and then the result is integrated from y = a to y = z, resulting in:

$$\int_a^z \int_a^x h(y) \ dy\ dx = \int_a^z  h(y)\ dy \   \int_y^z dx = \int_a^z \left(z-y\right) h(y)\, dy  .$$

This result can be seen to be an example of the formula for integration by parts, as stated below:

$$\int_a^z f(x) g'(x)\, dx = \left[ f(x) g(x) \right]_a^z - \int_a^z  f'(x) g(x)\, dx$$

Substitute:

$$f (x) = \int_a^x  h(y)\, dy ~\text{ and }~ g'(x) = 1 .$$

Which gives the result.

== Principal-value integrals ==
For application to principal-value integrals, see Whittaker and Watson, Gakhov, Lu, or Zwillinger. See also the discussion of the Poincaré-Bertrand transformation in Obolashvili. An example where the order of integration cannot be exchanged is given by Kanwal:

$$\frac {1}{(2\pi i )^2} \int_L^* \frac{d{\tau}_1}{{\tau}_1 - t}\ \int_L^*\ g(\tau)\frac{d \tau}{\tau-\tau_1} = \frac{1}{4} g(t) \ ,$$

while:

$$\frac {1}{(2\pi i )^2} \int_L^* g( \tau ) \ d \tau  \left(  \int_L^* \frac{d \tau_1 } {\left( \tau_1 - t\right) \left( \tau-\tau_1 \right)} \right) = 0 \ .$$

The second form is evaluated using a partial fraction expansion and an evaluation using the Sokhotski–Plemelj formula:

$$\int_L^*\frac{d \tau_1}{\tau_1-t} = \int_L^* \frac {d\tau_1}{\tau_1-t} = \pi\ i \ .$$

The notation $\int_L^*$ indicates a Cauchy principal value. See Kanwal.

== Basic theorems ==
A discussion of the basis for reversing the order of integration is found in the book Fourier Analysis by T.W. Körner. He introduces his discussion with an example where interchange of integration leads to two different answers because the conditions of Theorem II below are not satisfied. Here is the example:

$$\int_1^{\infty} \frac {x^2-y^2}{\left(x^2+y^2\right)^2}\ dy = \left[\frac{y}{x^2+y^2}\right]_1^{\infty} = -\frac{1}{1+x^2} \ \left[x \ge 1 \right]\ .$$

$$\int_1^{\infty} \left( \int_1^{\infty}\frac {x^2-y^2}{\left(x^2+y^2\right)^2}\ dy \right)\ dx = -\frac{\pi}{4} \ .$$
$$\int_1^{\infty} \left( \int_1^{\infty}\frac {x^2-y^2}{\left(x^2+y^2\right)^2}\ dx \right)\ dy = \frac{\pi}{4} \ .$$

Two basic theorems governing admissibility of the interchange are quoted below from Chaudhry and Zubair:

Theorem I—Let f(x, y) be a continuous function of constant sign defined for a ≤ x < ∞, c ≤ y < ∞, and let the integrals

$J(y):= \int_a^\infty f(x,\ y) \, dx$ and $J^*(x) = \int_c^\infty f(x, \ y) \, dy$
regarded as functions of the corresponding parameter be, respectively, continuous for c ≤ y < ∞, a ≤ x < ∞. Then if at least one of the iterated integrals
$\int_c^\infty \left(\int_a^\infty \ f(x,\ y) dx\right ) dy$ and $\int_a^\infty \ \left(\int_c^\infty \ f(x,\ y) dy\right ) dx$
converges, the other integral also converges and their values coincide.

Theorem II—Let f(x, y) be continuous for a ≤ x < ∞, c ≤ y < ∞, and let the integrals

$J(y):= \int_a^\infty f(x,\ y)\, dx$ and $J^*(x) = \int_c^\infty f(x, \ y) \, dy$
be respectively, uniformly convergent on every finite interval c ≤ y < C and on every finite interval a ≤ x < A. Then if at least one of the iterated integrals
$\int_c^\infty \left( \int_a^\infty |f(x,\ y)| dx \right) dy$ and $\int_a^\infty \ \left(\int_c^\infty |f(x,\ y)| dy \right ) dx$
converges, the iterated integrals
$\int_c^\infty \left( \int_a^{\infty} f(x,\ y) dx \right) dy$ and $\int_a^\infty \left(\int_c^\infty f(x,\ y) dy\right) dx$
also converge and their values are equal.

The most important theorem for the applications is quoted from Protter and Morrey:

Theorem—Suppose F is a region given by $F=\left\{(x,\ y):a \le x \le b, p(x) \le y \le q(x) \right\} \,$ where p and q are continuous and p(x) ≤ q(x) for a ≤ x ≤ b. Suppose that f(x, y) is continuous on F. Then

$\iint_F f(x,y) \,dA = \int_a^b \int_{p(x)}^{q(x)} f(x,\ y)\,dy\ dx .$
The corresponding result holds if the closed region F has the representation $F=\left\{(x,\ y):c\le y \le d,\ r(y) \le x \le s(y)\right\}$ where r(y) ≤ s(y) for c ≤ y ≤ d. In such a case,

$$\iint_F f(x,\ y) dA = \int_c^d  \int_{r(y)}^{s(y)} f(x,\ y)\, dx\ dy \ .$$

In other words, both iterated integrals, when computable, are equal to the double integral and therefore equal to each other.

== See also ==
- Fubini's theorem
