= Anthony Morse =

American mathematician

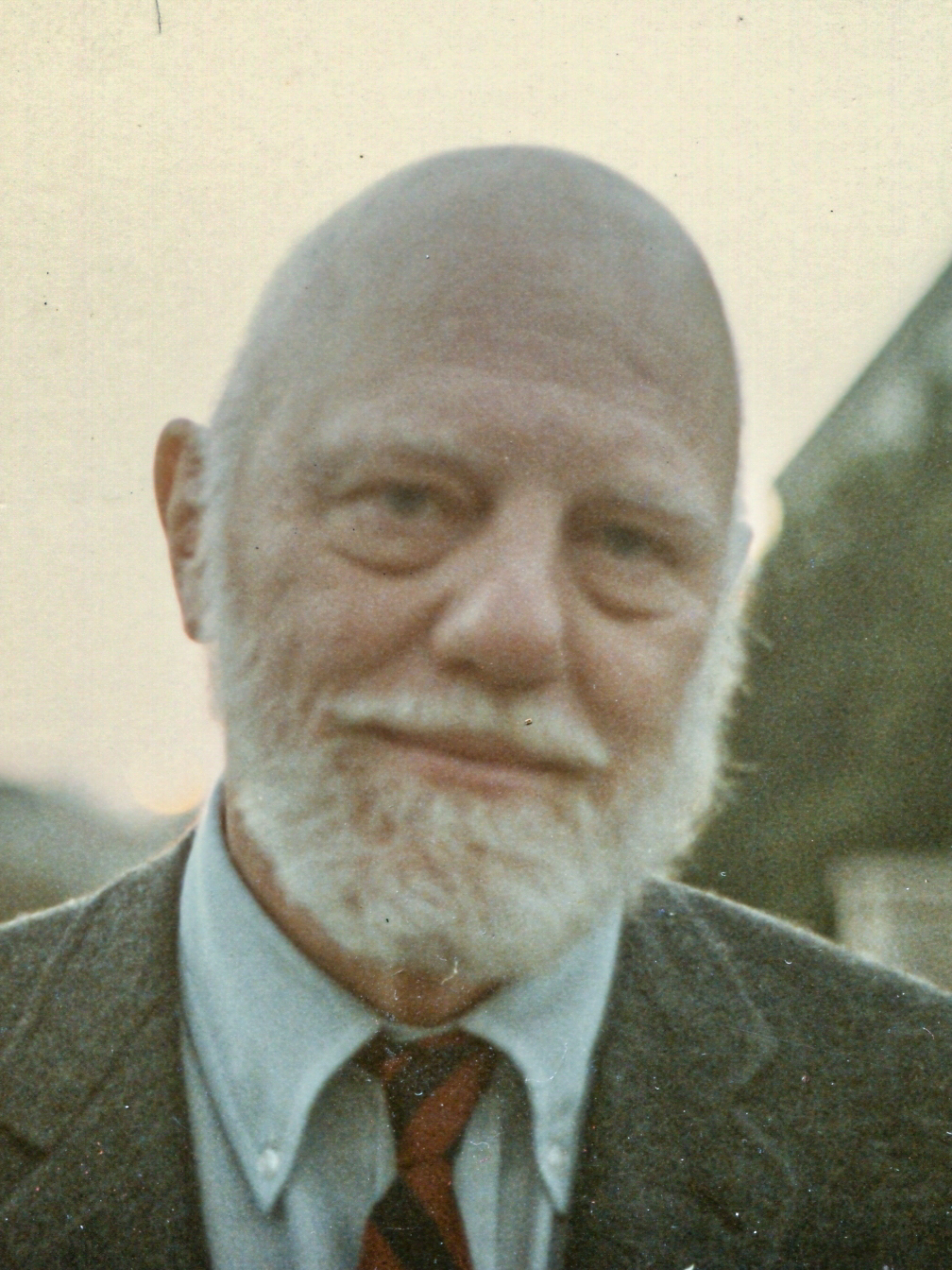
- Born: August 21, 1911; Ithaca, New York
- Died: March 6, 1984 (aged 72); Alameda County, California

Academic background
- Education: Cornell University; Brown University

Anthony Perry Morse (21 August 1911 – 6 March 1984) was an American mathematician who worked in both analysis, especially measure theory, and in the foundations of mathematics. He is best known as the co-creator, together with John L. Kelley, of Morse–Kelley set theory. This theory first appeared in print in Kelley's General Topology. Morse's own version appeared later in A Theory of Sets.

He is also known for his work on the Morse–Sard theorem and the Federer–Morse theorem.

Anthony Morse should not be confused with Marston Morse, known for developing Morse theory.

== Career ==
He received his PhD in 1937 at Brown University with C. R. Adams as thesis advisor. After two years at the Institute for Advanced Study he joined the mathematics faculty at Berkeley where except for two interruptions he worked for the rest of his life on mathematics. In the first of these, from 1943 until the end of World War II, he worked on ballistics at the Aberdeen Proving Ground. In 1950 his life was interrupted by the McCarthyist loyalty oath controversy. He was one of 29 "non-signers". But he was also one of 6 who took advantage of a 10-day grace period to sign, while continuing to refer to the remaining non-signers as "patriots."

His doctoral students include Herbert Federer, Woody Bledsoe, and Maurice Sion.
