= Woody Bledsoe =

American mathematician and computer scientist

Woodrow Wilson Bledsoe
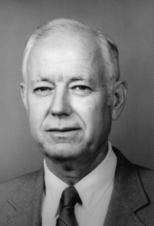
- Born: November 12, 1921; Maysville, Oklahoma
- Died: October 4, 1995 (aged 73)
- Education: University of California, Berkeley
- Spouse: Virginia (née Norgaard)
- Children: 4
- Awards: Bronze Star Medal 1945, IJCAI Distinguished Service Award 1991, AMS Milestone Award 1991, Herbrand Award 1994
- Scientific career
- Thesis: Separative Measures for Topological Spaces (1953)
- Doctoral advisor: Anthony Perry Morse
- Doctoral students: Robert S. Boyer

Woodrow Wilson "Woody" Bledsoe (November 12, 1921 – October 4, 1995) was an American mathematician, computer scientist, and prominent educator. He is one of the founders of artificial intelligence (AI), making early contributions in pattern recognition, facial recognition, and automated theorem proving. He continued to make significant contributions to AI throughout his long career. One of his influences was Frank Rosenblatt.

Beginning in 1966, he worked at the department of mathematics and computer science of the University of Texas at Austin, holding the Peter O'Donnell Jr. Centennial Chair in Computing Science starting in 1987.

Bledsoe joined the Church of Jesus Christ of Latter-day Saints as an adult, and served in the church as a bishop, counselor to the stake presidency, and stake patriarch. He also served as a leader in the Boy Scouts of America. Bledsoe died on October 4, 1995, of amyotrophic lateral sclerosis, more commonly known as ALS or Lou Gehrig's disease.

== Works ==
The n-tuple method (1959) was an early method for learning a pattern recognition program. The basic method is illustrated by the problem of recognizing 36 alphanumerical characters (0-9, a-z).

Let the input be a 10x15 binary image. It is equivalent to a single string with 150 binary letters. Now, randomly partition the 150 binary pixels into 75 pairs. Each pair has 4 possibilities: 00, 01, 10, 11. Now we will define a 300x36 binary matrix as follows:

Let $1_{00}$ represent the 00-state of the first pair, and similarly for the others. We have 300 such states, each represented in a row. The 36 columns each correspond to one alphanumerical character. The entire binary matrix is arranged as follows:
$$\begin{bmatrix}
& 0 & 1 & \cdots & 9 & a & b & \cdots & z \\
1_{00} & & & & \\
1_{01} & & & & \\
1_{10} & & & & \\
1_{11} & & & & \\
\vdots \\
75_{11} & & & & \\
\end{bmatrix}$$
The pattern recognizer is defined by the binary matrix. It is trained by firstsetting all entries to zero, then it is presented with several binary images of each alphanumerical character. For each image, the corresponding entries in the matrix are set to one, and the other entries are unchanged. This is an example of machine learning.

After the training the recognizer, it can be used to recognize new images. First compute the new image's corresponding column vector, then take the dot-product with each column of the binary matrix. The column with the highest dot-product is outputted as the most likely character.

== Selected publications ==
- W.W. Bledsoe (1977). "Non-Resolution Theorem Proving". Artificial Intelligence. 9: 1–35. doi:10.1016/0004-3702(77)90012-1.
- W.W. Bledsoe; I. Browning (1959). "Pattern recognition and reading by machine". Papers presented at the December 1-3, 1959, eastern joint IRE-AIEE-ACM computer conference on - IRE-AIEE-ACM '59 (Eastern). pp. 225–232. doi:10.1145/1460299.1460326. S2CID 15672245.
- Woody Bledsoe (1986). "I Had a Dream: AAAI Presidential Address, 19 August 1985". AI Magazine. 7 (1): 57–61.
