= Smooth coarea formula =

In Riemannian geometry, the smooth coarea formulas relate integrals over the domain of certain mappings with integrals over their codomains.

Let $\scriptstyle M,\,N$ be smooth Riemannian manifolds of respective dimensions $\scriptstyle m\,\geq\, n$. Let $\scriptstyle F:M\,\longrightarrow\, N$ be a smooth surjection such that the pushforward (differential) of $\scriptstyle F$ is surjective almost everywhere. Let $\scriptstyle\varphi:M\,\longrightarrow\, [0,\infty)$ a measurable function. Then, the following two equalities hold:

$$\int_{x\in M}\varphi(x)\,dM = \int_{y\in N}\int_{x\in F^{-1}(y)}\varphi(x)\frac{1}{N\!J\;F(x)}\,dF^{-1}(y)\,dN$$

$$\int_{x\in M}\varphi(x)N\!J\;F(x)\,dM = \int_{y\in N}\int_{x\in F^{-1}(y)} \varphi(x)\,dF^{-1}(y)\,dN$$

where $\scriptstyle N\!J\;F(x)$ is the normal Jacobian of $\scriptstyle F$, i.e. the determinant of the derivative restricted to the orthogonal complement of its kernel.

Note that from Sard's lemma almost every point $\scriptstyle y\,\in\, N$ is a regular point of $\scriptstyle F$ and hence the set $\scriptstyle F^{-1}(y)$ is a Riemannian submanifold of $\scriptstyle M$, so the integrals in the right-hand side of the formulas above make sense.
