= Federer–Morse theorem =

On a property of surjective continuous maps between compact metric spaces

In mathematics, the Federer–Morse theorem, introduced by Federer and Morse (1943), states that if f is a surjective continuous map from a compact metric space X to a compact metric space Y, then there is a Borel subset Z of X such that f restricted to Z is a bijection from Z to Y. Moreover, the inverse of that restriction is a Borel section of f—it is a Borel isomorphism.

== See also ==
- Uniformization
- Hahn–Banach theorem
