= Meroë Morse =

Photographic research scientist

- Morse in a Polaroid test photo, 1959
- Born: Meroë Marston Phelps Morse; June 20, 1923; Waterville, Maine, U.S.
- Died: July 29, 1969 (aged 46); Boston, Massachusetts, U.S.
- Education: Smith College
- Father: Marston Morse

Meroë Marston Phelps Morse (June 20, 1923-July 29, 1969) was an American photographic researcher who worked for Polaroid and was a key contributor to the development of instant photography.

== Early life and education ==
Morse was born in Waterville, Maine on June 20, 1923, to Céleste Phelps and Harold Calvin Marston Morse, a mathematician at the Institute for Advanced Study in Princeton, New Jersey. She was one of seven children fathered by Morse.

She attended Smith College, where she worked with art historian Clarence Kennedy, who was an early consultant to Polaroid. She wrote her senior thesis on Kennedy's Vectographs process. She graduated with a degree in art history.

== Career ==
Morse got a job at Polaroid after college in 1945 and started out working with Eudoxia Muller Woodward on the SX-70 team. When Muller left Polaroid in 1946 Morse followed in her position. She was an advisor to Edwin Land.

In 1948, Morse became the laboratory supervisor responsible for photographic materials. During this time she oversaw "round-the-clock shifts of researchers conducting thousands of experiments" at Polaroid's lab. Polaroid originally had film which produced sepia-toned prints. She supervised the team that designed and created black-and-white film with crisper prints. Land noted Morse's "valuable assistance in research that led to the new film." Morse took advantage of Polaroid's support for continuing education and took classes in chemistry at Harvard and MIT as well as classes in organic chemistry and organic chemical theory through Polaroid Research Seminars in the Organic Research Lab.

She became manager of their Black and White Photographic Research in 1955, charged with "creating a stable black-and-white print," a problem which would take years to solve. Her lab produced faster films including Type 42 (ASA 200) and Type 44 (ASA 400) allowing sharper photography in lower-light conditions or with subjects in motion.

Morse was a liaison to Ansel Adams, himself a Polaroid consultant who would test their film and cameras between 1948 and 1984. Adams gave lectures and taught courses, championed by Morse, on the Polaroid process for company employees. Paul Messier, Director of the Lens Media Lab at Yale’s Institute for the Preservation of Cultural Heritage, said that Morse's work was "a great example of the need for the ‘translational’ role played by humanists working between the technical/scientific arm of an enterprise and the users, including artists like Adams." Morse also worked with many other consulting photographers including Paul Caponigro, William Clift, Marie Cosindas, Minor White, Gerry Sharpe, and Brett Weston. She created Polaroid's Artist Support Program which provided Polaroid film and equipment to emerging and established artists whose work tested the technical and aesthetic boundaries of photography.

Fortune magazine noted Morse’s contributions as manager of black-and-white film research stating "Since 1948 [Land’s] closest associate in developing and improving the sixty-second process has been a Smith arts major named Meroe Morse.... Land credits her with many important contributions, especially those leading to Polaroid’s present impressive line of films." In 1966, she became director of special photographic research at Polaroid, sending frequent updates to Land as she worked to oversee the black-and-white division of Polaroid's manufacturing plant in Waltham, Massachusetts. Smith College awarded her the Smith College Medal in 1968, their outstanding graduate award. In May 1969 she became the first woman to be elected as a Fellow of the Society of Photographic Scientists and Engineers for her contributions to the field of photography. She is designated as the inventor of over thirty patents from her time at Polaroid.

== Other activities ==
Morse was an accomplished harpist and played in a group called the Three Arts Trio where she would alternate harp playing and sketching chalk drawings that interpreted the music. She was a director at Cambridge Settlement House, teaching classes in photography and art to children.

== Death and legacy ==
Morse died from cancer on July 29, 1969 in Boston, Massachusetts.

In 2024, the Baker Library at Harvard Business School mounted an exhibition called "From Concept to Product: Meroë Morse and Polaroid’s Culture of Art and Innovation, 1945–1969" using material about Morse from their Polaroid collection. One of her photographs is held by the National Gallery of Canada.
