= Herbert Federer =

American mathematician

Herbert Federer (July 23, 1920 – April 21, 2010) was an American mathematician. He is one of the creators of geometric measure theory, at the meeting point of differential geometry and mathematical analysis.

== Career ==
Federer was born July 23, 1920, in Vienna, Austria. After emigrating to the US in 1938, he studied mathematics and physics at the University of California, Berkeley, earning the Ph.D. as a student of Anthony Morse in 1944. He then spent virtually his entire career as a member of the Brown University Mathematics Department, where he eventually retired with the title of Professor Emeritus.

Federer wrote more than thirty research papers in addition to his book Geometric measure theory. The Mathematics Genealogy Project assigns him nine Ph.D. students and well over a hundred subsequent descendants. His most productive students include the late Frederick J. Almgren, Jr. (1933–1997), a professor at Princeton for 35 years, and his last student, Robert Hardt, now at Rice University.

Federer was a member of the National Academy of Sciences. In 1987, he and his Brown colleague Wendell Fleming won the American Mathematical Society's Steele Prize "for their pioneering work in Normal and Integral currents."^{[FF60]}

== Mathematical work ==
In the 1940s and 1950s, Federer made many contributions at the technical interface of geometry and measure theory. Particular themes included surface area, rectifiability of sets, and the extent to which one could substitute rectifiability for smoothness in the classical analysis of surfaces. A particularly noteworthy early accomplishment (improving earlier work of Abram Besicovitch) was the characterization of purely unrectifiable sets as those which "vanish" under almost all projections. Federer also made noteworthy contributions to the study of Green's theorem in low regularity. The theory of capacity with modified exponents was developed by Federer and William Ziemer.^{[FZ73]} In his first published paper, written with his Ph.D. advisor Anthony Morse, Federer proved the Federer–Morse theorem which states that any continuous surjection between compact metric spaces can be restricted to a Borel subset so as to become an injection, without changing the image.

One of Federer's best-known papers, Curvature Measures, was published in 1959.^{[F59]} The intention is to establish measure-theoretic formulations of second-order analysis in differential geometry, particularly curvature. The Steiner formula formed a fundamental precedent for Federer's work; it established that the volume of a neighborhood of a convex set in Euclidean space is given by a polynomial. If the boundary of the convex set is a smooth submanifold, then the coefficients of the Steiner formula are defined by its curvature. Federer's work was aimed towards developing a general formulation of this result. The class of subsets that he identified are those of positive reach, subsuming both the class of convex sets and the class of smooth submanifolds. He proved the Steiner formula for this class, identifying generalized quermassintegrals (called curvature measures by Federer) as the coefficients. In the same paper, Federer proved the coarea formula, which has become a standard textbook result in measure theory.

Federer's second landmark paper, Normal and Integral Currents, was co-authored with Wendell Fleming.^{[FF60]} In their work, they showed that Plateau's problem for minimal surfaces can be solved in the class of integral currents, which may be viewed as generalized submanifolds. Moreover, they identified new results on the isoperimetric problem and its relation to the Sobolev embedding theorem. Their paper inaugurated a new and fruitful period of research on a large class of geometric variational problems, and especially minimal surfaces.

In 1969, Federer published his book Geometric Measure Theory, which is among the most widely cited books in mathematics.^{[F69]} It is a comprehensive work beginning with a detailed account of multilinear algebra and measure theory. The main body of the work is devoted to a study of rectifiability and the theory of currents. The book ends with applications to the calculus of variations. Federer's book is considered an authoritative text on this material, and included a number of new results in addition to much material from past research of Federer and others. Much of his book's discussion of currents and their applications are limited to integral coefficients. He later developed the basic theory in the setting of real coefficients.^{[F75]}

A particular result detailed in Federer's book is that area-minimizing minimal hypersurfaces of Euclidean space are smooth in low dimensions. Around the same time, Enrico Bombieri, Ennio De Giorgi, and Enrico Giusti proved that a minimal hypercone in eight-dimensional Euclidean space, first identified by James Simons, is area-minimizing. As such, it is direct to construct area-minimizing minimal hypersurfaces of Euclidean space which have singular sets of codimension seven. In 1970, Federer proved that this codimension is optimal: all such singular sets have codimension of at least seven.^{[F70]} His dimension reduction argument for this purpose has become a standard part of the literature on geometric measure theory and geometric analysis. Later, Federer also found a new proof of the result of Bombieri–De Giorgi–Giusti.^{[F75]}

== Major publications ==
Federer was the author of around thirty research papers, along with his famous textbook Geometric Measure Theory.

F59.	Federer, Herbert (1959). "Curvature measures". Transactions of the American Mathematical Society. 93 (3): 418–491. doi:10.1090/S0002-9947-1959-0110078-1. MR 0110078. Zbl 0089.38402.

FF60.	Federer, Herbert; Fleming, Wendell H. (1960). "Normal and integral currents". Annals of Mathematics. Second Series. 72 (3): 458–520. doi:10.2307/1970227. JSTOR 1970227. MR 0123260. Zbl 0187.31301.

F69.	Federer, Herbert (1969). Geometric measure theory. Die Grundlehren der mathematischen Wissenschaften. Vol. 153. Berlin–Heidelberg–New York: Springer-Verlag. doi:10.1007/978-3-642-62010-2. ISBN 978-3-540-60656-7. MR 0257325. Zbl 0176.00801.

F70.	Federer, Herbert (1970). "The singular sets of area minimizing rectifiable currents with codimension one and of area minimizing flat chains modulo two with arbitrary codimension". Bulletin of the American Mathematical Society. 76 (4): 767–771. doi:10.1090/S0002-9904-1970-12542-3. MR 0260981. Zbl 0194.35803.

FZ73.	Federer, Herbert; Ziemer, William P. (1973). "The Lebesgue set of a function whose distribution derivatives are p-th power summable". Indiana University Mathematics Journal. 22 (2): 139–158. doi:10.1512/iumj.1973.22.22013. MR 0435361. Zbl 0238.28015.

F75.	Federer, Herbert (1975). "Real flat chains, cochains and variational problems". Indiana University Mathematics Journal. 24 (4): 351–407. doi:10.1512/iumj.1975.24.24031. MR 0348598. Zbl 0289.49044.
