= Fubini's theorem =

Conditions for switching order of integration in calculus

Fubini's theorem gives the conditions under which a double integral can be computed as an iterated integral, i.e. by integrating in one variable at a time. Intuitively, just as the volume of a loaf of bread is the same whether one sums over standard slices or over long thin slices, the value of a double integral does not depend on the order of integration when the hypotheses of the theorem are satisfied. The theorem is named after Guido Fubini, who proved a general result in 1907; special cases were known earlier through results such as Cavalieri's principle, which was used by Leonhard Euler.

More formally, the theorem states that if a function is Lebesgue integrable on a rectangle $X\times Y$, then one can evaluate the double integral as an iterated integral:
$$\, \iint\limits_{X\times Y} f(x,y)\,\mathrm{d}(x,y) = \int_X\left(\int_Y f(x,y)\,\mathrm{d}y\right)\mathrm{d}x=\int_Y\left(\int_X f(x,y) \, \mathrm{d}x \right)  \mathrm{d}y.$$

This formula is generally not true for the Riemann integral (however, it is true if the function is continuous on the rectangle; in multivariable calculus, this weaker result is sometimes also called Fubini's theorem).

Tonelli's theorem, introduced by Leonida Tonelli in 1909, is similar but is applied to a non-negative measurable function rather than to an integrable function over its domain. The Fubini and Tonelli theorems are usually combined and form the Fubini–Tonelli theorem, which gives the conditions under which it is possible to switch the order of integration in an iterated integral.

A related result is often called Fubini's theorem for infinite series, although it is due to Alfred Pringsheim. It states that if $\{a_{m,n}\}_{m=1,n=1}^{\infty}$ is a double-indexed sequence of real numbers, and if $\displaystyle \sum_{(m,n)\in \N\times \N} a_{m,n}$ is absolutely convergent, then
$$\sum_{(m,n)\in\N\times \N}a_{m,n} = \sum_{m=1}^\infty\sum_{n=1}^{\infty} a_{m,n} = \sum_{n=1}^\infty \sum_{m=1}^\infty a_{m,n}.$$

== History ==
A special case of Fubini's theorem for continuous functions on the product of closed, bounded subsets of real vector spaces was known to Leonhard Euler in the 18th century. In 1904, Henri Lebesgue extended this result to bounded measurable functions on a product of intervals. Beppo Levi conjectured that the theorem could be extended to functions that are integrable rather than bounded, and this was proven by Fubini in 1907. In 1909, Leonida Tonelli gave a variation of the Fubini theorem that applies to non-negative functions rather than integrable functions.

== Product measures ==
If X and Y are measure spaces, there are several natural ways to define a product measure on the product X × Y.

In the sense of category theory, measurable sets in the product X × Y of measure spaces are the elements of the σ-algebra generated by the products A × B, where A is measurable in X, and B is measurable in Y.

A measure μ on X × Y is called a 'product measure' if μ(A × B) = μ_{1}(A)μ_{2}(B) for measurable subsets A ⊂ X and B ⊂ Y and measures μ_{1} on X and μ_{2} on Y. In general, there may be many different product measures on X × Y. Fubini's theorem and Tonelli's theorem both require technical conditions to avoid this complication; the most common approach is to assume that all measure spaces are σ-finite, in which case there is a unique product measure on X × Y. There is always a unique maximal product measure on X × Y, where the measure of a measurable set is the inf of the measures of sets containing it that are countable unions of products of measurable sets. The maximal product measure can be constructed by applying Carathéodory's extension theorem to the additive function μ such that μ(A × B) = μ_{1}(A)μ_{2}(B) on the ring of sets generated by products of measurable sets. (Carathéodory's extension theorem gives a measure on a measure space that in general contains more measurable sets than the measure space X × Y, so strictly speaking, the measure should be restricted to the σ-algebra generated by the products A × B of measurable subsets of X and Y.)

The product of two complete measure spaces is not usually complete. For example, the product of the Lebesgue measure on the unit interval I with itself is not the Lebesgue measure on the square I × I. There is a variation of Fubini's theorem for complete measures, which uses the completion of the product of measures rather than the uncompleted product.

== For integrable functions ==
Suppose X and Y are σ-finite measure spaces and suppose that X × Y is given the product measure (which is unique as X and Y are σ-finite). Fubini's theorem states that if f is X × Y integrable, meaning that f is a measurable function and
$$\int_{X\times Y} |f(x,y)|\,\mathrm{d}(x,y) < \infty,$$
then
$$\int_X\left(\int_Y f(x,y)\,\mathrm{d}y\right)\,\mathrm{d}x = \int_Y\left(\int_X f(x,y)\,\mathrm{d}x\right)\,\mathrm{d}y = \int_{X\times Y} f(x,y)\,\mathrm{d}(x,y).$$

The first two integrals are iterated integrals with respect to two measures, respectively, and the third is an integral with respect to the product measure. The partial integrals $\int_Y f(x,y)\,\mathrm{d}y$ and $\int_X f(x,y)\,\mathrm{d}x$ need not be defined everywhere, but this does not matter as the points where they are not defined form a set of measure 0.

If the above integral of the absolute value is not finite, then the two iterated integrals may have different values.

The condition that X and Y are σ-finite is usually harmless because almost all measure spaces for which one wishes to use Fubini's theorem are σ-finite. Fubini's theorem has some rather technical extensions to the case when X and Y are not assumed to be σ-finite. The main extra complication in this case is that there may be more than one product measure on X × Y. Fubini's theorem continues to hold for the maximal product measure but can fail for other product measures. For example, there is a product measure and a non-negative measurable function f for which the double integral of |f| is zero but the two iterated integrals have different values. Tonelli's theorem and the Fubini–Tonelli theorem can fail on non σ-finite spaces, even for the maximal product measure.

== Tonelli's theorem for non-negative measurable functions ==
Tonelli's theorem, named after Leonida Tonelli, is a successor of Fubini's theorem. The conclusion of Tonelli's theorem is identical to that of Fubini's theorem, but the assumption that |f| has a finite integral is replaced by the assumption that f is a non-negative measurable function.

Tonelli's theorem states that if (X, A, μ) and (Y, B, ν) are σ-finite measure spaces, while $f:X\times Y \to [0,\infty]$ is a non-negative measurable function, then
$$\int_X\left(\int_Y f(x,y)\,\mathrm{d}y\right)\,\mathrm{d}x = \int_Y\left(\int_X f(x,y)\,\mathrm{d}x\right)\,\mathrm{d}y = \int_{X\times Y} f(x,y)\,\mathrm{d}(x,y).$$

A special case of Tonelli's theorem is in the interchange of the summations, as in $\sum_x \sum_y a_{xy} = \sum_y \sum_x a_{xy}$, where a_{xy} are non-negative for all x and y. The crux of the theorem is that the interchange of order of summation holds even if the series diverges. In effect, the only way a change in order of summation can change the sum is when there exist some subsequences that diverge to +∞ and others diverging to −∞. With all elements non-negative, this does not happen in the stated example.

Without the condition that the measure spaces are σ-finite, all three of these integrals can have different values. Some authors give generalizations of Tonelli's theorem to some measure spaces that are not σ-finite, but these generalizations often add conditions that immediately reduce the problem to the σ-finite case. For example, one could take the σ-algebra on A × B to be that generated by the product of subsets of finite measure, rather than that generated by all products of measurable subsets, though this has the undesirable consequence that the projections from the product to its factors A and B are not measurable. Another way is to add the condition that the support of f is contained in a countable union of products of sets of finite measures. D. H. Fremlin gives some rather technical extensions of Tonelli's theorem to some non σ-finite spaces. None of these generalizations have found any significant applications outside of abstract measure theory, largely because almost all measure spaces of practical interest are σ-finite.

== Fubini–Tonelli theorem ==
Combining Fubini's theorem with Tonelli's theorem gives the Fubini–Tonelli theorem. Often just called Fubini's theorem, it states that if X and Y are σ-finite measure spaces, and if f is a measurable function, then
$$\int_X\left(\int_Y |f(x,y)|\,\mathrm{d}y\right)\,\mathrm{d}x=\int_Y\left(\int_X |f(x,y)|\,\mathrm{d}x\right)\,\mathrm{d}y=\int_{X\times Y} |f(x,y)|\,\mathrm{d}(x,y)$$
Furthermore, if any one of these integrals is finite, then
$$\int_X\left(\int_Y f(x,y)\,\mathrm{d}y\right)\,\mathrm{d}x=\int_Y\left(\int_X f(x,y)\,\mathrm{d}x\right)\,\mathrm{d}y=\int_{X\times Y} f(x,y)\,\mathrm{d}(x,y).$$

The absolute value of f in the conditions above can be replaced by either the positive or the negative part of f; these forms include Tonelli's theorem as a special case as the negative part of a non-negative function is zero and so has finite integral. Informally, all these conditions say that the double integral of f is well defined, though possibly infinite.

The advantage of the Fubini–Tonelli over Fubini's theorem is that the repeated integrals of |f| may be easier to study than the double integral. As in Fubini's theorem, the single integrals may fail to be defined on a measure 0 set.

== For complete measures ==
The versions of Fubini's and Tonelli's theorems above do not apply to integration on the product of the real line $\mathbb{R}$ with itself with Lebesgue measure. The problem is that Lebesgue measure on $\mathbb{R}\times\mathbb{R}$ is not the product of Lebesgue measure on $\mathbb{R}$ with itself, but rather the completion of this: a product of two complete measure spaces $X$ and $Y$ is not in general complete. For this reason, one sometimes uses versions of Fubini's theorem for complete measures: roughly speaking, one replaces all measures with their completions. The various versions of Fubini's theorem are similar to the versions above, with the following minor differences:

- Instead of taking a product $X\times Y$ of two measure spaces, one takes the completion of the product.
- If $f$ is measurable on the completion of $X\times Y$then its restrictions to vertical or horizontal lines may be non-measurable for a measure zero subset of lines, so one has to allow for the possibility that the vertical or horizontal integrals are undefined on a set of measure 0 because they involve integrating non-measurable functions. This makes little difference, because they can already be undefined due to the functions not being integrable.
- One generally also assumes that the measures on $X$ and $Y$ are complete, otherwise the two partial integrals along vertical or horizontal lines may be well-defined but not measurable. For example, if $f$ is the characteristic function of a product of a measurable set and a non-measurable set contained in a measure 0 set then its single integral is well defined everywhere but non-measurable.

== Proofs ==
Proofs of the Fubini and Tonelli theorems are necessarily somewhat technical, as they have to use a hypothesis related to σ-finiteness. Most proofs involve building up to the full theorems by proving them for increasingly complicated functions, with the steps as follows.

1. Use the fact that the measure on the product is multiplicative for rectangles to prove the theorems for the characteristic functions of rectangles.
2. Use the condition that the spaces are σ-finite (or some related condition) to prove the theorem for the characteristic functions of measurable sets. This also covers the case of simple measurable functions (measurable functions taking only a finite number of values).
3. Use the condition that the functions are measurable to prove the theorems for positive measurable functions by approximating them by simple measurable functions. This proves Tonelli's theorem.
4. Use the condition that the functions are integrable to write them as the difference of two positive integrable functions and apply Tonelli's theorem to each of these. This proves Fubini's theorem.

=== Riemann integrals ===
For Riemann integrals, Fubini's theorem is proven by refining the partitions along the x-axis and y-axis as to create a joint partition of the form [x_{i}, x_{i+1}] × [y_{j}, y_{j+1}], which is a partition over X × Y. This is used to show that the double integrals of either order are equal to the integral over X × Y.

== Counterexamples ==
The following examples show how Fubini's theorem and Tonelli's theorem can fail if any of their hypotheses are omitted.

=== Failure of Tonelli's theorem for non σ-finite spaces ===
Suppose that X is the unit interval with the Lebesgue measurable sets and Lebesgue measure, and Y is the unit interval with all the subsets measurable and the counting measure, so that Y is not σ-finite. If f is the characteristic function of the diagonal of X × Y, then integrating f along X gives the 0 function on Y, but integrating f along Y gives the function 1 on X. So, the two iterated integrals are different. This shows that Tonelli's theorem can fail for spaces that are not σ-finite no matter which product measure is chosen. The measures are both decomposable, showing that Tonelli's theorem fails for decomposable measures (which are slightly more general than σ-finite measures).

=== Failure of Fubini's theorem for non-maximal product measures ===
Fubini's theorem holds for spaces even if they are not assumed to be σ-finite provided one uses the maximal product measure. In the example above, for the maximal product measure, the diagonal has infinite measure so the double integral of |f| is infinite, and Fubini's theorem holds vacuously.

However, if we give X × Y the product measure such that the measure of a set is the sum of the Lebesgue measures of its horizontal sections, then the double integral of |f| is zero, but the two iterated integrals still have different values. This gives an example of a product measure where Fubini's theorem fails.

This gives an example of two different product measures on the same product of two measure spaces. For products of two σ-finite measure spaces, there is only one product measure.

=== Failure of Tonelli's theorem for non-measurable functions ===
Suppose that X is the first uncountable ordinal, with the finite measure where the measurable sets are either countable (with measure 0) or the sets of countable complement (with measure 1). The (non-measurable) subset E of X × X given by pairs (x, y) with x < y is countable on every horizontal line and has countable complement on every vertical line. If f is the characteristic function of E then the two iterated integrals of f are defined and have different values 1 and 0. The function f is not measurable. This shows that Tonelli's theorem can fail for non-measurable functions.

=== Failure of Fubini's theorem for non-measurable functions ===
A variation of the example above shows that Fubini's theorem can fail for non-measurable functions even if |f| is integrable and both repeated integrals are well defined: if we take f to be 1 on E and –1 on the complement of E, then |f| is integrable on the product with integral 1, and both repeated integrals are well defined, but have different values 1 and –1.

Wacław Sierpiński demonstrated that assuming the continuum hypothesis, one can identify X with the unit interval I, so there is a bounded non-negative function on I × I whose two iterated integrals (using Lebesgue measure) are both defined but unequal. The stronger versions of Fubini's theorem on a product of two unit intervals with Lebesgue measure, where the function is no longer assumed to be measurable but merely that the two iterated integrals are well defined and exist, are independent of the standard Zermelo–Fraenkel axioms of set theory with the axiom of choice (ZFC). The continuum hypothesis and Martin's axiom both imply that there exists a function on the unit square whose iterated integrals are not equal, while Harvey Friedman showed that it is consistent with ZFC that a strong Fubini-type theorem for [0, 1] does hold, and whenever the two iterated integrals exist they are equal.

=== Failure of Fubini's theorem for non-integrable functions ===
Fubini's theorem tells us that (for measurable functions on a product of σ-finite measure spaces) if the integral of the absolute value is finite, then the order of integration does not matter; if we integrate first with respect to x and then with respect to y, we get the same result as if we integrate first with respect to y and then with respect to x. The assumption that the integral of the absolute value is finite is "Lebesgue integrability", and without it the two repeated integrals can have different values.

A simple example to show that the repeated integrals can be different in general is to take the two measure spaces to be the positive integers, and to take the function f(x, y) to be 1 if x = y, −1 if x = y + 1, and 0 otherwise. Then the two repeated integrals have different values 0 and 1.

Another example is as follows for the function
$$\frac{x^2-y^2}{(x^2+y^2)^2} = -\frac{\partial^2}{\partial x\,\partial y} \arctan(y/x),$$
defined in polar coordinates by $f_{\text{polar}}(r,\theta)=\frac{\cos(2\theta)}{r^2}$.

The iterated integrals have different values:
$$\begin{align}
\int_{x=0}^1\left(\int_{y=0}^1\frac{x^2-y^2}{(x^2+y^2)^2}\,\mathrm{d}y\right)\,\mathrm{d}x &= \frac{\pi}{4} \\
\int_{y=0}^1\left(\int_{x=0}^1\frac{x^2-y^2}{(x^2+y^2)^2}\,\mathrm{d}x\right)\,\mathrm{d}y &=-\frac{\pi}{4}
\end{align}$$
The corresponding double integral does not converge absolutely (the integral of the absolute value is not finite):
$$\int_0^1\int_0^1 \left|\frac{x^2-y^2}{\left(x^2 + y^2\right)^2}\right|\,\mathrm{d}y\,\mathrm{d}x
\,>\, \int_0^{\pi/2} \int_{0}^1 \frac{|\cos(2\theta)\,|}{r}\,\mathrm{d}r\,\mathrm{d}\theta
=\infty.$$

== Fubini's theorem in multiplications of integrals ==
For the product of two integrals with lower limit zero and a common upper limit we have the following formula:

$\left[\int_{0}^{u} v(x) \,\mathrm{d}x\right]\left[\int_{0}^{u} w(x) \,\mathrm{d}x\right] = \int_{0}^{1} \int_{0}^{u} x\,v(xy) \,w(x) + x\,v(x) \,w(xy) \,\mathrm{d}x \,\mathrm{d}y$

=== Proof ===
Let V(x) and W(x) be primitive functions of the functions v(x) and w(x) respectively, which pass through the origin:
$$\int_{0}^{u} v(x) \,\mathrm{d}x = V(u),
\quad \quad
\int_{0}^{u} w(x) \,\mathrm{d}x = W(u).$$

Therefore, we have
$$\left[\int_{0}^{u} v(x) \,\mathrm{d}x\right]\left[\int_{0}^{u} w(x) \,\mathrm{d}x\right] = V(u) W(u)$$

By the product rule, the derivative of the right-hand side is
$$\frac{\mathrm{d}}{\mathrm{d}x} \left[V(x) W(x)\right] = V(x)w(x) + v(x)W(x)$$

and by integrating we have:
$$\int_{0}^{u} V(x)w(x) + v(x)W(x) \,\mathrm{d}x=V(u) W(u)$$

Thus, the equation from the beginning we get:
$$\left[\int_{0}^{u} v(x) \,\mathrm{d}x\right]\left[\int_{0}^{u} w(x) \,\mathrm{d}x\right]= \int_{0}^{u} V(x)w(x) + v(x)W(x) \,\mathrm{d}x$$

Now, we introduce a second integration parameter y for the description of the antiderivatives V(x) and W(x):
$$\begin{alignat}{3}
\int_{0}^{1} x\,v(xy) \,\mathrm{d}y &= \left[V(xy)\right]_{y = 0}^{y = 1} &&= V(x) \\
\int_{0}^{1} x\,w(xy) \,\mathrm{d}y &= \left[W(xy)\right]_{y = 0}^{y = 1} &&= W(x)
\end{alignat}$$

By insertion, a double integral appears:
$$\left[\int_{0}^{u} v(x) \,\mathrm{d}x\right]\left[\int_{0}^{u} w(x) \,\mathrm{d}x\right]= \int_{0}^{u} \left[\int_{0}^{1} x\,v(xy) \,\mathrm{d}y\right]w(x) + v(x)\left[\int_{0}^{1} x\,w(xy) \,\mathrm{d}y\right] \,\mathrm{d}x$$

Since the functions v(x) and w(x) are independent of the integration variable y, they can be moved inside the inner integrals:
$$\left[\int_{0}^{u} v(x) \,\mathrm{d}x\right]\left[\int_{0}^{u} w(x) \,\mathrm{d}x\right]= \int_{0}^{u} \left[\int_{0}^{1} x\,v(xy) \,w(x) \,\mathrm{d}y\right] + \left[\int_{0}^{1} x\,v(x)\,w(xy) \,\mathrm{d}y\right] \,\mathrm{d}x$$

In the next step, the sum rule is applied to the integrals:
$$\left[\int_{0}^{u} v(x) \,\mathrm{d}x\right]\left[\int_{0}^{u} w(x) \,\mathrm{d}x\right]= \int_{0}^{u} \int_{0}^{1} x\,v(xy) \,w(x) + x\,v(x)\,w(xy) \,\mathrm{d}y \,\mathrm{d}x$$

And finally, we use Fubini's theorem
$$\left[\int_{0}^{u} v(x) \,\mathrm{d}x\right]\left[\int_{0}^{u} w(x) \,\mathrm{d}x\right]= \int_{0}^{1} \int_{0}^{u} x\,v(xy) \,w(x) + x\,v(x)\,w(xy) \,\mathrm{d}x \,\mathrm{d}y$$

== Calculation examples ==
=== Arcsine integral ===
Values of the inverse sine integral can be determined by exchanging the order of integration using Fubini's theorem. By expanding the integrand and swapping the integration variables, an elementary antiderivative can be found:

$$\begin{align}
\operatorname{Si}_{2}(1) &= \int_{0}^{1} \frac{\arcsin(x)}{x} \,\mathrm{d}x = \int_{0}^{1} \int_{0}^{1} \frac{\sqrt{1-x^2}\,y}{(1- x^2 y^2)\sqrt{1-y^2}} \,\mathrm{d}y \,\mathrm{d}x \\
&= \int_{0}^{1} \int_{0}^{1} \frac{\sqrt{1-x^2}\,y}{(1-x^2 y^2)\sqrt{1-y^2}} \,\mathrm{d}x \,\mathrm{d}y =\int_{0}^{1} \frac{\pi\,y}{2\sqrt{1-y^2}(1+\sqrt{1-y^2}\,)} \,\mathrm{d}y \\
&= \left\{ \frac{\pi}{2} \ln\left[2 \left(1 + \sqrt{1 - y^2}\,\right)^{-1}\right] \right\}_{y = 0}^{y = 1} = \frac{\pi}{2}\ln(2)
\end{align}$$

=== Dirichlet eta function ===
The Dirichlet series defines the Dirichlet eta function as follows:
$$\eta(s) = \sum_{n=1}^\infty \frac{(-1)^{n-1}}{n^s} = 1 - \frac{1}{2^s} + \frac{1}{3^s} - \frac{1}{4^s} + \frac{1}{5^s} - \frac{1}{6^s} \pm \cdots$$

The value $\eta(2) = \frac{\pi^2}{12}$ can be proven using Fubini's theorem. The condition for absolute convergence required to exchange the sum and the integral is satisfied because $\sum_{n=1}^\infty \int_0^1 \left|\frac{(-1)^{n-1}}{n}x^{n-1}\right|\,\mathrm{d}x = \sum_{n=1}^\infty \frac{1}{n^2} = \frac{\pi^2}{6} < \infty$. The evaluation proceeds as follows:
$$\eta(2) = \sum_{n = 1}^\infty (-1)^{n-1}\frac{1}{n^2} = \sum_{n = 1}^\infty \int_{0}^{1} (-1)^{n-1}\frac{1}{n} {x}^{n-1} \,\mathrm{d}x = \int_{0}^{1} \sum_{n = 1}^\infty (-1)^{n-1}\frac{1}{n} {x}^{n-1} \,\mathrm{d}x = \int_{0}^{1} \frac{\ln(x+1)}{x} \,\mathrm{d}x$$

The integral of the product of the reciprocal function and the natural logarithm is a polylogarithmic integral. Fubini's theorem allows this to be evaluated by translating the integrand into a combination of rational fractions:
$$\begin{align}
&\int_{0}^{1} \frac{\ln(x+1)}{x} \,\mathrm{d}x = \int_{0}^{1} \int_{0}^{1} \frac{4}{3(x^2+2xy+1)} + \frac{2x}{3(x^2y+1)} - \frac{1}{3(xy+1)} \,\mathrm{d}y \,\mathrm{d}x \\
&\hphantom{\quad\quad\quad} = \int_{0}^{1} \int_{0}^{1} \frac{4}{3(x^2+2xy+1)} + \frac{2x}{3(x^2y+1)} - \frac{1}{3(xy+1)} \,\mathrm{d}x \,\mathrm{d}y \\
&\hphantom{\quad\quad\quad} = \int_{0}^{1} \frac{2\arccos(y)}{3\sqrt{1-y^2}} \,\mathrm{d}y = \left[\frac{\pi^2}{12}-\frac{1}{3}\arccos(y)^2 \right]_{y = 0}^{y = 1} \\
&\hphantom{\quad\quad\quad} = \frac{\pi^2}{12}
\end{align}$$

This method of calculating the integral was discovered by James Harper.

=== Integrals of complete elliptic integrals ===
The improper integral of the complete elliptic integral of the first kind, $K(x)$, evaluates to twice the Catalan constant, $C$. This can be shown using Fubini's theorem to relate the expression to the arctangent integral:
$$\begin{align}
\int_{0}^{1} K(x) \,\mathrm{d}x &= \int_{0}^{1} \int_{0}^{1} \frac{1}{\sqrt{(1 - x^2 y^2)(1 - y^2)}} \,\mathrm{d}y \,\mathrm{d}x \\
&= \int_{0}^{1} \int_{0}^{1} \frac{1}{\sqrt{(1 - x^2 y^2)(1 - y^2)}} \,\mathrm{d}x \,\mathrm{d}y \\
&= \int_{0}^{1} \frac{\arcsin(y)}{y\sqrt{1 - y^2}} \,\mathrm{d}y \\
&= \left\{ 2\,\mathrm{Ti}_{2} \!\!\left[ y\left(1 + \sqrt{1 - y^2}\,\right)^{\!\!-1} \right]\! \right\}_{y = 0}^{y = 1} \\
&= 2\,\mathrm{Ti}_{2}(1) =2\beta(2) =2\,C
\end{align}$$

The same procedure applies to the complete elliptic integral of the second kind, $E(x)$:
$$\begin{align}
\int_{0}^{1} E(x) \,\mathrm{d}x &=\int_{0}^{1} \int_{0}^{1} \frac{\sqrt{1 - x^2 y^2}}{\sqrt{1 - y^2}} \,\mathrm{d}y \,\mathrm{d}x \\
&= \int_{0}^{1}\int_{0}^{1} \frac{\sqrt{1 - x^2 y^2}}{\sqrt{1 - y^2}} \,\mathrm{d}x \,\mathrm{d}y \\
&= \int_{0}^{1} \left[\frac{\arcsin(y)}{2y\sqrt{1 - y^2}} + \frac{1}{2}\right] \,\mathrm{d}y \\
&= \left\{ \mathrm{Ti}_{2} \left[ y\left(1 + \sqrt{1 - y^2}\,\right)^{-1} \right] + \frac{1}{2} y \right\}_{y = 0}^{y = 1} \\
&= \mathrm{Ti}_{2}(1) + \frac{1}{2} =\beta(2) + \frac{1}{2} =C + \frac{1}{2}
\end{align}$$

=== Double execution for the exponential integral function ===
The Euler–Mascheroni constant, $\gamma$, emerges as the improper integral from zero to infinity of the product of the negative natural logarithm and the exponential decay function. It can also be represented as an improper integral of a related difference:
$$\gamma = \int_0^\infty \frac{-\ln(x)}{\exp(x)}\,\mathrm{d}x = \int_{0}^{\infty} \frac{1}{x}\left[\frac{1}{x + 1}-\exp(-x)\right] \,\mathrm{d}x$$

The equivalence of these two integrals can be shown by executing Fubini's theorem twice, relating both to the complementary exponential integral function:
$$\mathrm{E}_{1}(x) = \exp(-x)\int_{0}^{\infty} \frac{\exp(-xy)}{y+1} \, \mathrm{d}y$$

The derivative of the complementary integral exponential function is:
$$\frac{\mathrm{d}}{\mathrm{d}x} \,\mathrm{E}_{1}(x) = -\frac{1}{x}\exp(-x)$$

Applying Fubini's theorem to the first integral form yields:
$$\begin{align}
\gamma &= \int_{0}^{\infty} -\exp(-y)\ln(y) \,\mathrm{d}y \\
&= \int_{0}^{\infty} \int_{0}^{\infty} \exp(-y)\left(\frac{1}{x + y} - \frac{1}{x + 1}\right) \,\mathrm{d}x \,\mathrm{d}y \\
&= \int_{0}^{\infty}\int_{0}^{\infty} \exp(-y)\left(\frac{1}{x + y} - \frac{1}{x + 1}\right) \,\mathrm{d}y \,\mathrm{d}x \\
&= \int_{0}^{\infty} \left[\exp(x)\,\mathrm{E}_{1}(x) - \frac{1}{x + 1}\right] \,\mathrm{d}x
\end{align}$$

Applying Fubini's theorem to the intermediate integral connects it to the second form:
$$\begin{align}
\gamma &= \int_{0}^{\infty} \left[\exp(x)\,\mathrm{E}_{1}(x) - \frac{1}{x + 1}\right] \,\mathrm{d}x \\
&= \int_{0}^{\infty}\int_{0}^{\infty} \exp(-xz)\left[\frac{1}{z + 1}-\exp(-z)\right] \,\mathrm{d}z \,\mathrm{d}x \\
&= \int_{0}^{\infty}\int_{0}^{\infty} \exp(-xz)\left[\frac{1}{z + 1}-\exp(-z)\right] \,\mathrm{d}x \,\mathrm{d}z \\
&= \int_{0}^{\infty} \frac{1}{z}\left[\frac{1}{z + 1}-\exp(-z)\right] \,\mathrm{d}z
\end{align}$$

=== Normal distribution integral ===
Using the identity for the squaring of an integral:
$$\left[\int_{0}^{\infty} f(x) \,\mathrm{d}x\right]^2 = \int_{0}^{1} \int_{0}^{\infty} 2x\,f(x) \,f(xy)\,\mathrm{d}x \,\mathrm{d}y$$

The integral of the normal distribution can be evaluated:
$$\begin{align}
\left[\int_{0}^{\infty} \exp(-x^2) \,\mathrm{d}x\right]^2 &= \int_{0}^{1} \int_{0}^{\infty} 2x\exp(-x^2)\exp(-x^2 y^2) \,\mathrm{d}x\,\mathrm{d}y \\
&= \int_{0}^{1} \int_{0}^{\infty} 2x\exp\left[-x^2 (y^2 + 1)\right] \,\mathrm{d}x\,\mathrm{d}y \\
&= \int_{0}^{1} \left\{- \frac{1}{y^2 + 1}\exp\left[-x^2(y^2 + 1)\right]\right\}_{x = 0}^{x = \infty} \,\mathrm{d}y \\
&= \int_{0}^{1} \frac{1}{y^2 + 1} \,\mathrm{d}y \\
&= \arctan(1) = \frac{\pi}{4}
\end{align}$$

Taking the square root yields:
$$\int_{0}^{\infty} \exp(-x^2) \,\mathrm{d}x = \frac{\sqrt{\pi}}{2}$$

=== Dilogarithm of one ===
Using a similar formula for the squaring of an integral over a finite bound:
$$\left[\int_{0}^{1} g(x) \,\mathrm{d}x\right]^2 = \int_{0}^{1} \int_{0}^{1} 2x\,g(x) \,g(xy)\,\mathrm{d}x \,\mathrm{d}y$$

This can be applied to the Basel problem:
$$\begin{align}
\frac{\pi^2}{4} &= \left(\arcsin(1)\right)^2 = \left[\int_{0}^{1} \frac{1}{\sqrt{1 - x^2}} \,\mathrm{d}x\right]^2 \\
&= \int_{0}^{1} \int_{0}^{1} \frac{2x}{\sqrt{(1 - x^2)(1 - x^2 y^2)}} \,\mathrm{d}x \,\mathrm{d}y \\
&= \int_{0}^{1} \left[\frac{2}{y}\operatorname{artanh}(y) - \frac{2}{y}\operatorname{artanh}\left(\frac{\sqrt{1 - x^2}\,y}{\sqrt{1 - x^2 y^2}}\right)\right]_{x = 0}^{x = 1}\,\mathrm{d}y \\
&= \int_{0}^{1} \frac{2}{y}\operatorname{artanh}(y) \,\mathrm{d}y \\
&= \left[2\,\mathrm{Li}_{2}(y) - \frac{1}{2}\,\mathrm{Li}_{2}(y^2)\right]_{y = 0}^{y = 1} \\
&= \frac{3}{2}\,\mathrm{Li}_{2}(1)
\end{align}$$

For the Dilogarithm of one, this yields:
$$\mathrm{Li}_{2}(1) = \frac{\pi^2}{6}$$

=== Legendre's relation ===
Using the generalized product formula:
$$\left[\int_{0}^{1} v(x) \,\mathrm{d}x\right]\left[\int_{0}^{1} w(x) \,\mathrm{d}x\right]= \int_{0}^{1} \int_{0}^{1} \left(x\,v(xy) \,w(x) + x\,v(x)\,w(xy)\right) \,\mathrm{d}x \,\mathrm{d}y$$

The following integrals can be computed using incomplete elliptic integrals of the first and second kind as antiderivatives:
$$\begin{align}
\int_{0}^{1} \frac{1}{\sqrt{1 - x^4}} \,\mathrm{d}x &= \left\{ - \frac{1}{2}\sqrt{2}\,F\left[\arccos(x);\frac{1}{2}\sqrt{2}\right] \right\}_{x = 0}^{x = 1} \\
&= \frac{1}{2}\sqrt{2}\,K\left(\frac{1}{2}\sqrt{2}\right) \\
\int_{0}^{1} \frac{x^2}{\sqrt{1 - x^4}} \,\mathrm{d}x &= \left\{\frac{1}{2}\sqrt{2}\,F\left[\arccos(x);\frac{1}{2}\sqrt{2}\right] - \sqrt{2}\,E\left[\arccos(x);\frac{1}{2}\sqrt{2}\right] \right\}_{x = 0}^{x = 1} \\
&= \frac{1}{2}\sqrt{2}\left[2\,E\left(\frac{1}{2}\sqrt{2}\right) - K\left(\frac{1}{2}\sqrt{2}\right)\right]
\end{align}$$

Inserting these two integrals into the product formula gives:
$$\begin{align}
&\left[\int_{0}^{1} \frac{1}{\sqrt{1 - x^4}} \,\mathrm{d}x\right]\left[\int_{0}^{1} \frac{x^2}{\sqrt{1 - x^4}} \,\mathrm{d}x\right] = \int_{0}^{1} \int_{0}^{1} \frac{x^3 (y^2+1)}{\sqrt{(1 - x^4)(1 - x^4 y^4)}} \,\mathrm{d}x\,\mathrm{d}y \\
&\hphantom{\quad\quad\quad}= \int_{0}^{1} \left\{\frac{y^2 + 1}{2\,y^2}\left[\operatorname{artanh}\left(y^2\right) - \operatorname{artanh}\left(\frac{\sqrt{1 - x^4}\,y^2}{\sqrt{1 - x^4 y^4}}\right)\right]\right\}_{x = 0}^{x = 1}\,\mathrm{d}y \\
&\hphantom{\quad\quad\quad}= \int_{0}^{1} \frac{y^2 + 1}{2\,y^2}\,\operatorname{artanh}\left(y^2\right) \,\mathrm{d}y \\
&\hphantom{\quad\quad\quad}= \left[\arctan(y) - \frac{1 - y^2}{2\,y}\,\operatorname{artanh}\left(y^2\right)\right]_{y = 0}^{y = 1} \\
&\hphantom{\quad\quad\quad}= \arctan(1) = \frac{\pi}{4}
\end{align}$$

For the lemniscatic special case of Legendre's relation, this yields:
$$K\left(\frac{1}{2}\sqrt{2}\right)\left[2\,E\left(\frac{1}{2}\sqrt{2}\right) - K\left(\frac{1}{2}\sqrt{2}\right)\right] = \frac{\pi}{2}$$

== See also ==
- Cavalieri's principle – Geometrical concept relating area and volume − an early particular case
- Coarea formula – Mathematical formula − generalization to geometric measure theory
- Disintegration theorem – theorem in measure theory, a restricted converse to Fubini's theorem
- Fubini's theorem for distributions - version of Fubini's theorem for distributions, that is, generalized functions
- Kuratowski–Ulam theorem – analog of Fubini's theorem for arbitrary second countable Baire spaces
- Symmetry of second derivatives − analogue for differentiation
- Fubini's nightmare – Apparent violation of Fubini's theorem
