= Borel space =

Borel space may refer to:

- any measurable space
- a measurable space that is Borel isomorphic to a measurable subset of the real numbers

== See also ==
- Standard Borel space
