= Fubini's nightmare =

Apparent violation of Fubini's theorem

Fubini's nightmare is a seeming violation of Fubini's theorem, where a nice space, such as the square $[0,1]\times[0,1] ,$ is foliated by smooth fibers, but there exists a set of positive measure whose intersection with each fiber is singular (at most a single point in Katok's example). There is no real contradiction to Fubini's theorem because despite smoothness of the fibers, the foliation is not absolutely continuous, and neither are the conditional measures on fibers.

Existence of Fubini's nightmare complicates fiber-wise proofs for center foliations of partially hyperbolic dynamical systems: these foliations are typically Hölder but not absolutely continuous.

A hands-on example of Fubini's nightmare was suggested by Anatole Katok and published by John Milnor. A dynamical version for center foliation was constructed by Amie Wilkinson and Michael Shub.

== Katok's construction ==
=== Foliation ===
For a $p \in (0,1)$ consider the coding of points of the interval $[0,1]$ by sequences of zeros and ones, similar to the binary coding, but splitting the intervals in the ratio $(1-p):p$. (As for the binary coding, we identify $0111\ldots$ with $1000\ldots$)

The point, corresponding to a sequence $(a_1, a_2, ...) \in \{0,1\}^{\N},$ is given explicitly by

$$F_p(a_1,a_2,\dots)
= \sum_{n: a_n=1} a_n (1-p) \ell_{n-1}
= \sum_{n=1}^{\infty} a_n p^{\# \{j\le n-1: \, a_j=1\}} (1-p)^{1+\,\# \{j\le n-1: \, a_j=0\}},$$

where $\ell_n= p^{\# \{j\le n: a_j=1\}} (1-p)^{\# \{j\le n: a_j=0\}}$ is the length of the interval after first $n$ splits.

Katok's foliation

For a fixed sequence $a \in \{0,1\}^{\N},$ the map $p\mapsto F_p(a)$ is analytic. This follows from the Weierstrass M-test: the series for $p\mapsto F_p(a)$ converges uniformly on compact subsets of the intersection $\{|p| <1 \} \cap \{|1-p| <1 \} \subset \mathbb{C} .$ In particular, $\gamma_a = \{ (p, F_p(a)) : p\in (0,1) \}$ is an analytic curve.

Now, the square $(0,1)\times [0,1]$ is foliated by analytic curves $\gamma_a, a \in \{0,1\}^{\N}.$

=== Set ===
For a fixed $p$ and random $x\in [0,1],$ sampled according to the Lebesgue measure, the coding digits $a_1=a_1(x;p), a_2=a_2(x;p), ...$ are independent Bernoulli random variables with parameter $p$, namely $P (a_n = 1) = p$ and $P (a_n = 0) = 1 - p .$

By the law of large numbers, for each $p$ and almost every $x,$

$$\frac{1}{n} \sum_{j=1}^n a_j(x;p) \to p, \quad n\to\infty.$$

By Fubini's theorem, the set

$$M = \left\{ (p,x) : \frac{1}{n} \sum_{j=1}^n a_j(x;p) \, \xrightarrow[n\to\infty]{} \, p \right\}$$

has full Lebesgue measure in the square $(0,1)\times [0,1]$.

However, for each fixed sequence $(a_n),$ the limit of its Cesàro averages $(a_1 + \cdots + a_n) / n$ is unique, if it exists. Thus every curve $\gamma_a$ either does not intersect $M$ at all (if there is no limit), or intersects it at the single point $(p,F_p(a)),$ where

$$p=\lim_{n\to\infty} \frac{a_1+\dots+ a_n}{n}.$$

Therefore, for the above foliation and set $M$, we observe a Fubini's nightmare.

== Wilkinson–Shub construction ==
Wilkinson and Shub considered diffeomorphisms which are small perturbations of the diffeomorphism $A\times id$ of the three dimensional torus $T^3=T^2\times S^1 ,$ where $A=\left(\begin{smallmatrix} 2& 1 \\ 1 &1\end{smallmatrix}\right):T^2\to T^2$ is the Arnold's cat map. This map and its small perturbations are partially hyperbolic. Moreover, the center fibers of the perturbed maps are smooth circles, close to those for the original map.

The Wilkinson and Shub perturbation is designed to preserve the Lebesgue measure and to make the diffeomorphism ergodic with the central Lyapunov exponent $\lambda_c \neq 0 .$ Suppose that $\lambda_c$ is positive (otherwise invert the map). Then the set of points, for which the central Lyapunov exponent is positive, has full Lebesgue measure in $T^3.$

On the other hand, the length of the circles of the central foliation is bounded above. Therefore, on each circle, the set of points with positive central Lyapunov exponent has to have zero measure. More delicate arguments show that this set is finite, and we have the Fubini's nightmare.
