= Arthur Everett Pitcher =

American mathematician

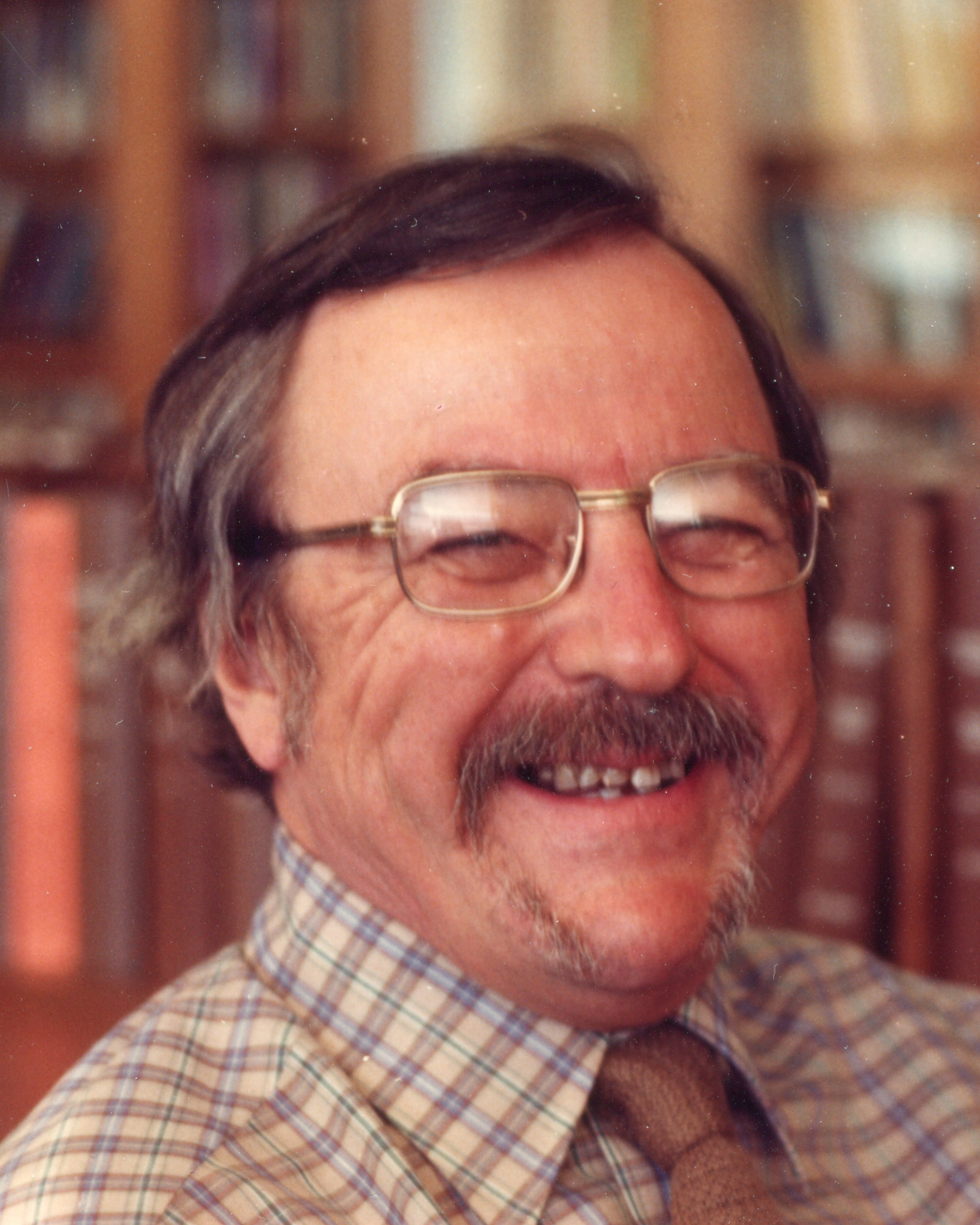
Pitcher in 1982

Arthur Everett Pitcher (known as Everett Pitcher; 18 July 1912, Hanover, New Hampshire – 4 December 2006) was an American mathematician, known for early pioneering work on exact sequences and applying Morse theory to homotopy theory.

== Biography ==
Everett Pitcher grew up in Cleveland, where his father, Arthur Dunn Pitcher, headed the mathematics department at Adelbert College of Western Reserve University until he died of heart failure in 1924 at the age of 43. Everett Pitcher's mother was a math teacher, and his father received a Ph.D. in mathematics from the University of Chicago under E. H. Moore. Everett Pitcher received in 1932 an A.B. from Western Reserve University, in 1933 an M.A., and in 1935 a Ph.D. from Harvard University under Marston Morse with the thesis Certain Invariants of Closed Extremals.

After two years as a Benjamin Peirce Instructor at Harvard, Pitcher joined the mathematics faculty of Lehigh University in 1938, where he remained except for a leave of absence serving in the U. S. Army during World War II and for some sabbaticals. At Lehigh he served as chair of the department from 1960 until his retirement in 1978. He was a Guggenheim Fellow for the academic year 1952–1953. Everett gave an Invited Address to the American Mathematical Society in 1955, published as "Inequalities of critical point theory".

Pitcher was one of the founders of the Society for Industrial and Applied Mathematics and a member of its Board of Trustees from 1961 to 1963. He was an AMS Associate Secretary from 1959 to 1966 and then Secretary of the AMS from 1966 to 1988.

== Legacy ==
In 1936, Everett married physician Sarah Mathiott Hindman, and they had two daughters, Susan Pitcher and Joan Pitcher Morrison. After Dr. Sarah Hindman Pitcher died in 1972, Everett married Theresa Sell in 1973. Theresa died in 2001. Together, Everett and Theresa established the Everett Pitcher Fund for the Propagation of Mathematics, which allows Lehigh University to host the annual Pitcher Lecture series featuring prominent mathematicians. In recognition of Everett's contributions, Lehigh also created the Pitcher Chair in Mathematics and the Pitcher Research Scholars in Mathematics program.

In 1985 the Mathematical Association of America gave Everett Pitcher the Award for Distinguished Service. He described his work for the AMS in his reminiscences "Off the Record".
