= Arthur Sard =

American mathematician

Arthur Sard (28 July 1909, New York City – 31 August 1980, Basel) was an American mathematician, famous for his work in differential topology and in spline interpolation. His fame stems primarily from Sard's theorem, which says that the set of critical values of a differential function which has sufficiently many derivatives has measure zero.

== Life and career ==
Arthur Sard was born and grew up in New York City and spent most of his adult life there. He attended the Friends Seminary, a private school in Manhattan, and went to college at Harvard University, where he received in 1931 his bachelor's degree, in 1932 his master's degree, and in 1936 his PhD under the direction of Marston Morse. Sard's PhD thesis has the title The measure of the critical values of functions. He was a member of the first faculty members at the then newly founded Queens College, where he worked from 1937 to 1970.

During WWII Sard worked as a member, under the auspices of the Applied Mathematics Panel, of the Applied Mathematics Group of Columbia University (AMG-C), especially in support of fire control for machine guns mounted on bombers. Saunders Mac Lane wrote concerning Sard: “His judicious judgments kept AMG-C on a straight course, […]”.

Sard retired as professor emeritus in 1970 at Queens College and then worked at La Jolla, where he spent five years as a research associate in the mathematics department of the University of California, San Diego. In 1975 he went to Binningen near Basel and taught at various European universities and research institutes. In 1978 he accepted an invitation from the Soviet Academy of Sciences to be a guest lecturer. In 1978 and 1979 he was a guest professor at the University of Siegen. Arthur Sard died on 31 August 1980 in Basel.

From 1938 until his death Sard published almost forty research articles in refereed mathematical journals. Also he wrote two monographs: in 1963 the book Linear Approximation and in 1971, in collaboration with Sol Weintraub, A Book of Splines. According to the book review from the Deutsche Mathematiker-Vereinigung the content-rich („inhaltsreiche“) Linear Approximation is an important contribution to the theory of approximation of integrals, derivatives, function values, and sums („ein wesentlicher Beitrag zur Theorie der Approximation von Integralen, Ableitungen, Funktionswerten und Summen“).

== Works ==
Sard published thirty-eight research articles and the two following monographs:

- Arthur Sard: Linear approximation. 2nd edn. American Mathematical Society, Providence, Rhode Island 1963, ISBN 0-8218-1509-1 (Mathematical Surveys and Monographs. Vol. 9).
- Arthur Sard, Sol Weintraub: A Book of Splines. John Wiley & Sons Inc, New York 1971, ISBN 0-471-75415-3

=== Articles ===
- Sard, Arthur (1942), "The measure of the critical values of differentiable maps", Bulletin of the American Mathematical Society, 48 (12): 883–890, doi:10.1090/S0002-9904-1942-07811-6, MR 0007523, Zbl 0063.06720
- "The equivalence of n-measure and Lebesgue measure in E_{n}", Bull. Amer. Math. Soc., 49 (10): 758–759, 1943, doi:10.1090/s0002-9904-1943-08025-1, MR 0008837
- Sard, Arthur (1948), "The remainder in approximations by moving averages", Bull. Amer. Math. Soc., 54 (8): 788–792, doi:10.1090/s0002-9904-1948-09081-4, MR 0028366
- Sard, Arthur (1952), "Remainders as integrals of partial derivatives", Proc. Amer. Math. Soc., 3 (5): 732–741, doi:10.1090/s0002-9939-1952-0050645-6, MR 0050645
- Sard, Arthur (1952), "Approximation and variance", Trans. Amer. Math. Soc., 73 (3): 428–446, doi:10.1090/s0002-9947-1952-0052688-x, MR 0052688
- Sard, Arthur (1965), "Hausdorff Measure of Critical Images on Banach Manifolds", American Journal of Mathematics, 87 (1): 158–174, doi:10.2307/2373229, JSTOR 2373229, MR 0173748, Zbl 0137.42501 and also Sard, Arthur (1965), "Errata to Hausdorff measures of critical images on Banach manifolds", American Journal of Mathematics, 87 (3): 158–174, doi:10.2307/2373229, JSTOR 2373074, MR 0180649, Zbl 0137.42501
- Sard, Arthur (1965), "Function spaces", Bull. Amer. Math. Soc., 71 (3, Part 1): 397–418, doi:10.1090/s0002-9904-1965-11282-4, MR 0185429
- Sard, Arthur (1969), "A theory of cotypes", Bull. Amer. Math. Soc., 75 (5): 936–940, doi:10.1090/s0002-9904-1969-12302-5, MR 0245051

== Sources ==
- Franz-Jürgen Delvos, Walter Schempp: Arthur Sard – In Memoriam. In: Walter Schempp, Karl Zeller (eds.): Multivariate Approximation Theory II, Proceedings of the Conference held at the Mathematical Research Institute at Oberwolfach, Black Forest, February 8–12, 1982. Birkhäuser Verlag, Basel 1982, ISBN 3-7643-1373-0 (International Series of Numerical Mathematics. Vol. 61), pp. 23–24.
