= Sard's theorem =

Theorem in mathematical analysis

In mathematics, Sard's theorem, also known as Sard's lemma or the Morse–Sard theorem, is a result in mathematical analysis that asserts that the set of critical values (that is, the image of the set of critical points) of a smooth function f from one Euclidean space or manifold to another is a null set, i.e., it has Lebesgue measure 0. This makes the set of critical values "small" in the sense of a generic property. The theorem is named for Anthony Morse and Arthur Sard.

== Statement ==
More explicitly, let

$$f\colon \mathbb{R}^n \rightarrow \mathbb{R}^m$$

be $C^k$, (that is, $k$ times continuously differentiable), where $k\geq \max\{n-m+1, 1\}$. Let $X \subset \mathbb R^n$ denote the critical set of $f,$ which is the set of points $x\in \mathbb{R}^n$ at which the Jacobian matrix of $f$ has rank $<m$. Then the image $f(X)$ has Lebesgue measure 0 in $\mathbb{R}^m$.

Intuitively speaking, this means that although $X$ may be large, its image must be small in the sense of Lebesgue measure: while $f$ may have many critical points in the domain $\mathbb{R}^n$, it must have few critical values in the image $\mathbb{R}^m$.

More generally, the result also holds for mappings between differentiable manifolds $M$ and $N$ of dimensions $m$ and $n$, respectively. The critical set $X$ of a $C^k$ function

$$f:N\rightarrow M$$

consists of those points at which the differential

$$df:TN\rightarrow TM$$

has rank less than $m$ as a linear transformation. If $k\geq \max\{n-m+1,1\}$, then Sard's theorem asserts that the image of $X$ has measure zero as a subset of $M$. This formulation of the result follows from the version for Euclidean spaces by taking a countable set of coordinate patches. The conclusion of the theorem is a local statement, since a countable union of sets of measure zero is a set of measure zero, and the property of a subset of a coordinate patch having zero measure is invariant under diffeomorphism.

== Idea of the proof ==
A standard proof of Sard's theorem proceeds by reducing the global statement to a local one, and then analyzing the critical set according to how many derivatives vanish at a point.

Since the conclusion is local, one first reduces to the case of a smooth map

$$f:\mathbb R^n\to\mathbb R^m$$

defined on a bounded subset of Euclidean space. Indeed, the domain may be covered by countably many bounded pieces, and a countable union of sets of measure zero again has measure zero. In the manifold case, one further reduces to Euclidean space by passing to coordinate charts, since the property of having measure zero is preserved under diffeomorphisms.

The proof is then by induction, separating the critical set into pieces according to the order of vanishing of derivatives. One considers points where all partial derivatives up to a given order vanish, and points where some derivative of lower order is nonzero. The former are the points at which the map is highly flat, while the latter can be treated by reducing to a lower-dimensional problem.

If some derivative of positive order does not vanish at a critical point, then after a suitable change of coordinates one obtains a local factorization in which one variable can be separated from the others. This makes it possible to apply the induction hypothesis to a map in lower dimension, showing that the corresponding set of critical values has measure zero.

For the points where many successive derivatives vanish, Taylor's theorem gives the key estimate. If all derivatives of order at most $r$ vanish at a point, then on a sufficiently small neighborhood the map changes only by terms of order $r+1$. Thus the image of a small cube in the domain is contained in a set of very small diameter in $\mathbb R^m$. Covering the bounded part of the critical set by many such small cubes and summing the corresponding volume estimates, one shows that the total measure of the image can be made arbitrarily small, and hence is zero.

Combining these two parts of the argument yields the theorem for smooth maps. For maps of class $C^k$, the same strategy works provided one only uses derivatives up to order $k$. The condition

$$k\ge \max\{n-m+1,1\}$$

ensures that there is enough differentiability for the Taylor-expansion and covering argument to force the set of critical values to have measure zero.

== Variants ==
There are many variants of this lemma, which plays a basic role in singularity theory among other fields. The case $m=1$ was proven by Anthony P. Morse in 1939, and the general case by Arthur Sard in 1942.

A version for infinite-dimensional Banach manifolds was proven by Stephen Smale.

The statement is quite powerful, and the proof involves analysis. In topology it is often quoted — as in the Brouwer fixed-point theorem and some applications in Morse theory — in order to prove the weaker corollary that “a non-constant smooth map has at least one regular value”.

In 1965 Sard further generalized his theorem to state that if $f:N\rightarrow M$ is $C^\infty$ and if $A_r\subseteq N$ is the set of points $x\in N$ such that $df_x$ has rank less or equal than $r$, then the Hausdorff dimension of $f(A_r)$ is at most $r$.

== See also ==
- Generic property
