= Tonelli (surname) =

Tonelli is an Italian surname. Notable people with this name include the following:

- Alessandro Tonelli (born 1992), Italian cyclist
- Anna Tonelli (c.1763–1846), Italian portrait painter in the late 17th century and early 18th century.
- Annalena Tonelli (1943–2003), Italian lawyer and social activist
- Bobby Tonelli (born 1975), American actor
- Gilles Tonelli (born 1957), Monegasque politician
- Giuseppe Tonelli (1668–1732), Italian painter
- Guido Tonelli (born 1950), Italian physicist
- Ideler Tonelli (1924–2016), Argentine lawyer and politician
- John Tonelli (born 1957), Canadian ice hockey player
- Leonida Tonelli (1885–1946), Italian mathematician
- Lorenzo Tonelli (born 1990), Italian footballer
- Maria Valentina Tonelli (1939–2016), Italian writer
- Mario Tonelli (1916–2003), American gridiron football player and survivor of the Bataan Death March
- Mark Tonelli (born 1957), Australian swimmer
- Pablo Tonelli (born 1954), Argentine politician
- Simone Tonelli (born 1991), Italian footballer
- Virginia Tonelli (1903–1944), Italian partisan

== See also ==
- Tonelli (disambiguation)
- Tonello
- Alessandro Tonolli
