= Tonelli =

Tonelli may refer to:

- Tonelli (surname)

== Arts ==
- Tonelli (film), a 1943 German film

== Science ==
- Tonelli's theorem (functional analysis)
- Tonelli's theorem
- Tonelli–Shanks algorithm
- Tonelli–Hobson test
