= Federico Cafiero =

Italian mathematician (1914–1980)

- Born: 24 May 1914; Riposto, Kingdom of Italy
- Died: 7 May 1980 (aged 65); Naples, Italy
- Education: University of Naples Federico II
- Awards: Tenore prize of the Accademia Pontaniana (1952); Golden medal "Benemeriti della Scuola, della Cultura, dell'Arte" (awarded by the President of the Italian Republic) (1976)
- Scientific career
- Fields: Measure and Integration theory; Ordinary differential equations; Real analysis
- Workplaces: Sapienza University of Rome; Istituto Universitario Navale; University of Naples Federico II; University of Catania; University of Pisa; Scuola Normale Superiore
- Doctoral advisor: Renato Caccioppoli

Federico Cafiero (24 May 1914 – 7 May 1980) was an Italian mathematician known for his contributions in real analysis, measure and integration theory, and in the theory of ordinary differential equations. In particular, generalizing the Vitali convergence theorem, the Fichera convergence theorem and previous results of Vladimir Mikhailovich Dubrovskii, he proved a necessary and sufficient condition for the passage to the limit under the sign of integral: this result is, in some sense, definitive. In the field of ordinary differential equations, he studied existence and uniqueness problems under very general hypotheses for the left member of the given first-order equation, developing an important approximation method and proving a fundamental uniqueness theorem.

== Life and academic career ==
Cafiero was born in Riposto, Province of Catania, on May 24, 1914. He obtained his Laurea in mathematics, cum laude, from the University of Naples Federico II in 1939. During the 1939–1940 academic year, he won an "Istituto Nazionale di Alta Matematica" scholarship and went in Rome to the institute: there he followed the courses held by Francesco Severi, Mauro Picone, Luigi Fantappiè, Giulio Krall and Leonida Tonelli.

=== World War II years: 1941–1943 ===
He was appointed instructor of the course of "Elementi di matematica" by the Faculty of Statistical Sciences of the University of Rome, for the 1940–1941 academic year: however, he was able to hold the course only for a few months, since he was called to arms in January 1941 and stationed from May 1942 to September 1943 on the Northern African coasts as an officer of the San Marco Battalion. It was there that, after having successfully completed a dangerous sabotage operation, the Armistice between Italy and Allied armed forces surprised him and the other members of his unit, leaving them without any support. Nonetheless, in desperate conditions, he was able to lead his men to the Italian coasts with a rubber dinghy, and was awarded a Silver Medal of Military Valor for this act.

=== Rebuilding and researching: the years 1944–1953 ===
After being discharged from Military Service in February 1944, he remained in Naples.

The Institute of Mathematics of the University of Naples was in the process of reconstituting as the eight former mathematics institutes of the university was literally "torn to pieces" by the Allied forces Military Police.

Reconstitution consisted of collecting and reordering all the volumes of the previously existing library, then piled on the floor of a single room, catalogue them ex novo and create new records and provide the library administration for the new library as there was no administrative personnel available nor financial resources.

work was done to organize courses and exams for the numerous war veterans coming back from the front and for new students, with more than a half of the teaching personnel blocked beyond the Gothic Line: and in performing all those task Cafiero, jointly with few others and working as an adjunct professor of "Esercitazioni di Matematiche", was a collaborator of Renato Caccioppoli and Carlo Miranda.

Also in 1944 he married Jole Giorgini, his lifelong companion, and soon after they had a daughter, Anna.

Due to the scarce possibilities of being hired permanently by the Faculty of Sciences at that time, he accepted a position as adjunct assistant professor to the chair of Financial Mathematics, working with Luigi Lordi first at the Istituto Universitario Navale and then to the Faculty of Economics and Business, where he was appointed full assistant professor in June 1949. Nonetheless, his ties with the Faculty of Sciences remained strong, being employed there as an adjunct professor of "Esercitazioni di Matematiche" several times, during those years: he was likewise assigned to several other courses related to Financial Mathematics by the Istituto Universitario Navale and by the Faculty of Business and Economics.

The scientific aspect of the collaboration with the Faculty of Sciences was nonetheless very intense, leading him to the "libera docenza" in March 1951, and to a full professorship chair in 1953: during this period, his scientific activity was done side by side at first with Carlo Miranda and later with Renato Caccioppoli, who found in him a dear pupil and friend.

Ranked first of the three winners of the competition for the chair of mathematical analysis of the University of Catania, in December 1953 he was appointed as extraordinary professor to that chair, and left Naples for Catania.

=== First in Catania and then in Pisa: the years 1954–1959 ===
Cafiero started his service at the University of Catania in January 1954. His arrival at the university brought several innovations, both in teaching and in the research activity on mathematical analysis. In particular, he established a seminar on abstract measure theory open to assistant professors and to graduate students as well, and this was felt as true scientific revolution: he held the chair of mathematical analysis for three years. After becoming ordinary professor in 1956, he went to the University of Pisa on request by Sandro Faedo: during his stay, he held courses also at the Scuola Normale Superiore, becoming director of the "Leonida Tonelli" Institute and member of Board of directors of the Centro Studi Calcolatrici Elettroniche.

=== Honors ===
Apart from the silver medal awarded him for his valor acts during the military service, the importance of his scientific achievements was acknowledged several times. In 1952 he received the Tenore Prize of the Accademia Pontaniana for a memoir on the theory of integration, later published as the paper (Cafiero 1953) and the monograph (Cafiero 1953a). On May 25, 1954 he was elected resident corresponding member of the Accademia Gioenia di Catania during his stay at the University of Catania, and became non resident corresponding member from November 16, 1956 on, after his moving to Pisa and then to Naples.

== Work ==
=== Research activity ===
Ma è subito dopo la seconda guerra mondiale che il processo di astrattizzazione della teoria della misura e dell'integrale si completa in modo definitivo. A ciò contribuirono Paul Halmos negli U.S.A. e Renato Caccioppoli, Federico Cafiero (1914–1980) ed altri in Italia.

— Gaetano Fichera, (Fichera 1993, p. 78).

=== Teaching activity ===
Come Andreotti anche Stampacchia non poté venire subito a Pisa e così io fui felice di avere con me un altro valoroso allievo di Renato Caccioppoli, Federico Cafiero, che restò a Pisa poco tempo, ma vi lasciò una forte traccia e formò il suo valido continuatore Giorgio Letta.

— Sandro Faedo, (Faedo 1986, p. 104).

== Selected publications ==
The papers of Federico Cafiero listed in this section are also included in his "Opere scelte" (Cafiero 1996), which collects all his published notes and one of his books.

- Cafiero, Federico (1953), "Sul passaggio al limite sotto il segno d'integrale per successioni d'integrali di Stieltjes-Lebesgue negli spazi astratti, con masse variabili con gli integrandi" [On the passage to the limit under the sign of integral for sequences of Stieltjes–Lebesgue integrals in abstract spaces, with masses varying jointly with integrands], Rendiconti del Seminario Matematico della Università di Padova (in Italian), 22: 223–245, MR 0057951, Zbl 0052.05003, is the first paper where Federico Cafiero states and proves his convergence theorem.
- Cafiero, Federico (1953a), Funzioni additive d'insieme e integrazione negli spazi astratti [Additive set functions and integration in abstract spaces] (in Italian), Naples: Libreria Editrice Liguori, p. 178, MR 0056671, Zbl 0050.27801, is the prize-winning first monograph where Federico Cafiero states and proves his convergence theorem.
- Cafiero, Federico (1959), Misura e integrazione [Measure and integration], Monografie matematiche del Consiglio Nazionale delle Ricerche (in Italian), vol. 5, Rome: Edizioni Cremonese, pp. VII+451, MR 0215954, Zbl 0171.01503, is a definitive monograph on integration and measure theory: the treatment of the limiting behaviour of the integral of various kinds of sequences of measure-related structures (measurable functions, measurable sets, measures and their combinations) is somewhat conclusive.
- Cafiero, Federico (1996), Opere scelte, a cura del Dipartimento di matematica e applicazioni R. Caccioppoli dell'Università degli studi di Napoli Federico II e con il contributo dell'Accademia Pontaniana e dei dipartimenti di matematica delle università di Catania, di Napoli e di Pisa (in Italian), Naples: Giannini Editore, p. 701. Federico Cafiero's "Selected works", including all his published papers, three postcards from his master Renato Caccioppoli concerning his research and his book "Lezioni sulla teoria delle funzioni di variabili reali" (English: "Lectures on the theory of functions of real variables").

== See also ==
- Carathéodory's existence theorem
- Dominated convergence theorem
- Peano existence theorem
- Picard–Lindelöf theorem
