= Sylvia Wiegand =

American mathematician (born 1945)

Sylvia Margaret Wiegand
- Born: March 8, 1945 (age 81); Cape Town, South Africa
- Education: University of Wisconsin-Madison
- Scientific career
- Fields: Commutative algebra math education, history of math
- Thesis: Galois Theory of Essential Expansions of Modules and Vanishing Tensor Powers (1972)
- Doctoral advisor: Lawrence S. Levy
- Doctoral students: Christina Eubanks-Turner

Sylvia Margaret Wiegand (born March 8, 1945) is an American mathematician.

== Early life and education ==
Wiegand was born in Cape Town, South Africa. She is the daughter of mathematician Laurence Chisholm Young and through him the granddaughter of mathematicians Grace Chisholm Young and William Henry Young. Her family moved to Wisconsin in 1949, and she graduated from Bryn Mawr College in 1966 after three years of study. In 1971, Wiegand earned her Ph.D. from the University of Wisconsin-Madison. Her dissertation was titled Galois Theory of Essential Expansions of Modules and Vanishing Tensor Powers.

== Career ==
In 1987, she was named full professor at the University of Nebraska–Lincoln; at the time Wiegand was the only female professor in the department. In 1988, Sylvia headed a search committee for two new jobs in the math department, for which two women were hired, although one stayed only a year and another left after four years. In 1996, Sylvia and her husband, Roger Wiegand, established a fellowship for graduate student research at the university in honor of Sylvia's grandparents.

From 1997 until 2000, Wiegand was president of the Association for Women in Mathematics.

Wiegand has been an editor for Communications in Algebra and the Rocky Mountain Journal of Mathematics. She was on the board of directors of the Canadian Mathematical Society from 1997 to 2000.

Wiegand was an American Mathematical Society (AMS) Council member at large.

== Awards and recognition ==
Wiegand is featured in the book Notable Women in Mathematics: A Biographical Dictionary, edited by Charlene Morrow and Teri Perl, published in 1998. For her work in improving the status of women in mathematics, she was awarded the University of Nebraska–Lincoln's Outstanding Contribution to the Status of Women Award in 2000. In May 2005, the University of Nebraska–Lincoln hosted the Nebraska Commutative Algebra Conference: WiegandFest "in celebration of the many important contributions of Sylvia and her husband Roger Wiegand."

In 2012, she became a fellow of the AMS.

In 2017, she was selected as a fellow of the Association for Women in Mathematics in the inaugural class.
