= Josep Maria Nadal i Farreras =

Josep Maria Nadal i Farreras (born 1949, in Girona, Catalonia, Spain) is Professor of History of Language at the University of Girona.

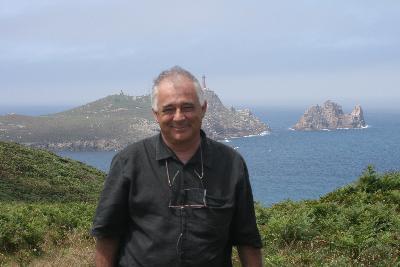
Josep M. Nadal

== Biography ==
He graduated in Romance Philology at the University of Barcelona and is Ph.D. in Hispanic Studies at the Autonomous University of Barcelona since 1975. He worked at this university for sixteen years, where he became Professor in 1987 and he held several management positions. From this position he promoted the creation of the University of Girona, which happened in December 1991. He was Chancellor of this new university from 1993 to early 2002. He has also been Chair of the Department of Language and Communication from 2009 to 2012. He is a member of the Institute of Catalan Language and Culture and Director of the Observatory of European and the Mediterranean Languages (ODELLEUM). He has promoted various forums for scientific and interdisciplinary discussion. Since 2009 is member of the Philological Section of the Institute for Catalan Studies. That same year he received the Jaume Vicens Vives Price for University Quality awarded by the Government of Catalonia.

His early research focused on generative linguistics and in 1975 defended his doctoral thesis Aspectes de la subordinació en català actual: per una sintaxi abstracta (On Aspects of the Current Catalan Subordination: Towards an Abstract Syntax). Soon, however, and beside Modest Prats he became interested in the History of the Catalan Language from a new approach: the study of the linguistic aspects in relation to those social and within the historical context. Both experts set themselves to write a History of the Catalan language from this perspective. In 1982 they published the first volume of the Història de la llengua catalana: dels inicis al segle XV (History of Catalan language: from the beginning until the 15th century) and in 1986 the second, Història de la llengua catalana: el segle XV (History of the Catalan language: the 15th century). Other three volumes are still in progress and researchers from the Group of History of the Language at the University of Girona, as August Rafanell, Narcís Iglésias, Joan Ferrer Costa or Francesc Feliu, have been incorporated to the project.

== A particular view of the History of Language ==
Josep M. Nadal has contributed decisively to characterize History of Language as independent linguistic discipline. Along with his research group from Girona, he has aimed to research in the history of languages from an interdisciplinary perspective, incorporating contributions coming from the field of literature, social history or other apparently further disciplines like sociology, psychology or philosophy of the language.

The team headed by Josep M. Nadal, on the other hand, has been interested in the history of Catalan language but always in relation to other historical processes that European languages have undergone, especially Romance languages. Moreover, they have worried about theoretical and methodological aspects, so that led them to discuss questions linked to the concept of language itself and the role played by disciplines such as philology and linguistics in the history of languages. These questions have focused several international colloquia held in Girona with the motto Problems and Methods of History of Language that, throughout more than twenty years, have gathered internationally recognized researchers like Alberto Varvaro, Bernard Cerquiglini, Sylvain Auroux, Francesco Bruni, John E. Joseph, José Antonio Pascual, Francesco Sabatini, Maria Leonor Carvalhão-Buescu, Paolo Trovato, Jean-Michel Eloy, Rosanna Sornicola, etc.

== Personal life ==
He is the brother of Catalan politician Joaquim Nadal.

== Work ==
Books

- (1982) Història de la llengua catalana, vol. I.: Dels inicis al segle XV, with Modest Prats, Edicions 62, Barcelona, 534 p. ISBN 8429719040 (v. 1).
- (1986) Història de la llengua catalana, II. Segle XV, with Modest Prats, Edicions 62, Barcelona, 601 p. ISBN 8429742336 (v. 2).
- (1993) Llengua escrita i llengua nacional, Edicions Quaderns Crema, Barcelona, ISBN 978-84-7727-106-2.
- (2005) La llengua sobre el paper, CCG Edicions, Girona,ISBN 849644435X.
- (2007) Las 1001 lenguas, Aresta, 150 p., Bellcaire d’Empordà, ISBN 9788493594824.

Some recent articles

- (2001) "Són les llengües semblants a les aigües del mar: normativa i història de la llengua", in Estudis de Filologia Catalana. 12 anys de l’Institut de Llengua i Cultura Catalanes, Publicacions Abadia de Montserrat, Barcelona, p. 9–27.
- (2005) "La llengua de dins i de fora de la caverna", in Glòria Claveria i Cristina Buenafuentes (eds.), Germà Colon: Les llengües romàniques juntes i contrastades, Cuadernos de Filología, 5, Universitat Autònoma de Barcelona, 2005, p. 51-68.
- (2005) "Llengua de veritat: repensar l'ortografia." El Llibre i la lectura: una revolució en la història de la humanitat (Actes del seminari del CUIMPB-CEL)/ in Joan Martí i Castell & Josep M. Mestres i Serra (ed.), Institut d'Estudis Catalans, Barcelona, p. 135-150, ISBN 978-84-7283-924-3.
- (2006) "La llengua 'normal'" in A. Ferrando i Miquel Nicolás (eds.), La configuració social de la norma lingüística a l’Europa Llatina, Symposia philologica, Alacant, p. 15-30, ISBN 84-7283-867-6.
- (2006) "Un home d’estrany e incògnit idioma: els mapes de les llengües", in Joan Martí & Josep M. Mestres (eds.), El català i la Unió Europea, Institut d’Estudis Catalans/CUIMP, Barcelona, p. 219- 234,ISBN 84-7283-867-6.
- (2006) "Les llengües en el naixement de l’Europa Moderna", in Actes del Tretzè Col.loqui Internacional de Llengua i Literatura Catalanes, Vol. I, Publicacions de l’Abadia de Montserrat, Barcelona, p. 43-63, ISBN 84-8415-845-4.
- (2007) "La llengua de veritat: repensar l’ortografia", dins Joan Martí i Josep M. Mestres (eds.), El llibre i la lectura: una revolució en la història de la humanitat, Institut d’Estudis Catalans / CUIMP, Barcelona, p. 150-170, ISBN 978-84-7283-924-3.
- (2007) "Llengua i construcció social", in Joan Martí & Josep M. Mestres (eds.), La multiculturalitat i les llengües, Institut d’Estudis Catalans / CUIMP, Barcelona, p. 157-170, ISBN 978-84-7283-897-0.
- (2007) "Mecanismos psicosociales implicados en la construcción narrativa de la identidad. Un diagnóstico sociopolítico, un enfoque teórico y una aproximación metodológica.", with M. Esteban and N. Vila Bricolage. Revista de estudiantes de Antropología Social y Geografía Humana, 14, México, p. 56-67, ISSN 1870-4573.
- (2008) "Malalts de llengua: llengües, fronteres, magnituds", in Jornades de la Secció Filològica de l’Institut d’Estudis Catalans a Banyoles, Institut d’Estudis Catalans, Barcelona, p. 51-70. ISBN 978-84-7283-973-1.
- (2009) "Languages and Frontiers. A question of Maps.", in M. Carme Junyent (ed.) Transferences. The Expression of Extra-linguistic Processes in the World's Languages, Eumo, Vic, p. 57-74. ISBN

9788497663526.

- (2012) "Des inventions nécessaires. Éloge de la linguistique.", in Josep M. Nadal & Anne-Marie Chabrolle (ed.). L'espace des langues. L'Harmattan, Paris.
