= Emilio Baiada =

Italian mathematician (1914–1984)

- Born: 12 January 1914; Tunis, Tunisia
- Died: 14 May 1984 (aged 70); Modena, Italy
- Education: Scuola Normale Superiore
- Awards: Michel prize of the Scuola Normale Superiore (1937); Merlani prize of the Accademia delle Scienze dell'Istituto di Bologna (1940); Golden medal "Benemeriti della Scuola, della Cultura, dell'Arte" (awarded by the President of the Italian Republic) (1976)
- Scientific career
- Fields: Calculus of variations; Ordinary differential equations; Real analysis
- Workplaces: Università di Palermo; Università di Modena
- Doctoral advisor: Leonida Tonelli
- Other academic advisors: Marston Morse

Emilio Baiada (also known as Emilio Bajada); (12 January 1914 – 14 May 1984) was an Italian mathematician, working in mathematical analysis and the calculus of variation.

== Biography ==
=== Personal life, education and career ===
Baiada was born on 12 January 1914 in Tunis. He studied at the Scuola Normale Superiore in Pisa, where he graduated with highest honors in June 1937 along with Leonida Tonelli, with whom he worked as an assistant from 1938 to 1941, when he left for the war. In 1945 he began to teach analysis, theory of functions, calculus and rational mechanics at the Scuola Normale. In 1948 he obtained a degree in Analysis; his Ph.D. thesis was written under the direction of Tonelli and Marston Morse.

In 1949 he went on leave from the University of Pisa and moved first to the University of Cincinnati, where he worked with scientists like Otto Szász and Charles Napoleon Moore, and then to Princeton University, where he worked with Morse.

In 1952 he obtained the chair of analysis of the University of Palermo, where he taught until 1961 just before transferring to the University of Modena. During his stay in Palermo he married Raffaella Martini, former pupil in Pisa and lifelong partner, by whom he had two children, Enrica and Carlo.

In 1968, from June 17 to June 30, he held a seminar upon invitation at the NATO Advanced Study Institute in Venezia.

He worked at the University of Modena for the rest of his life: in Modena he re-launched the Institute of Mathematics and developed further its Library and its Mathematical Seminar.

=== Death ===
On the 14th of May 1984, he suddenly died in Parma: the birthday conference on real analysis dedicated to him that was organized by his pupils, colleagues, collaborators and friends for June 1984 turned to a memorial meeting attended, among others, by Lamberto Cesari, Silvio Cinquini and Sandro Faedo.

=== Honors ===
Baiada won the Michel prize for the best thesis in Pisa, and the 1940 Merlani prize of the Accademia delle Scienze dell'Istituto di Bologna for "contributions on subjects of calculus of variations". During his stay in Palermo, from 1952 to 1961, he was elected corresponding member of the Accademia Nazionale di Scienze, Lettere e Arti di Palermo. In 1967 he was elected corresponding member of the Accademia di Scienze, Lettere e Arti di Modena. On 9 June 1976, he was awarded the Golden medal "Benemeriti della Scuola, della Cultura, dell'Arte" by the President of the Italian Republic.

== Work ==
=== Institutional work ===
Cosicché se nei confronti della matematica I meriti di Bajada sono immensi, c'è da soggiungere che Bajada avrebbe potuto fare ancora di più, se l'Università di Modena lo avesse chiamato alcuni anni prima.

— Silvio Cinquini, (Cattelani Degani 2022, p. 8).

Emilio Baiada was one of the leading forces behind the reprise in mathematical studies in Modena in the postwar period. He taught mathematical analysis there from 1961 up to his death, and moreover was director of the institute of mathematics of the university from the academic year 1962–63 to the 1966—67 one. He strongly advocated the dedication of the department to Giuseppe Vitali, and that was effectively done in 1966: furthermore he strongly advocated the construction of a new building for the department, which opened officially during the 1974–75 academic year. During his stay in Modena, Emilio Baiada devoted particular effort to enrich and keep up to date the mathematics department library, established earlier by Antonio Pignedoli.

He held the direction of the direction of the Atti del Seminario Matematico e Fisico dell'Università di Modena from 1977 up to 1983. While the journal history and the succession of his directors has followed a somewhat complex dynamics, it can be surely said that he was entrusted with the direction of the journal by his colleagues. Under his direction the journal widened its circulation, improved the quality of published works, and become an international journal, not just the publishing service of the Seminar of Mathematics and Physics of the University of Modena.

=== Teaching activity ===
In 1961 he went from Palermo to Modena, teaching several mathematical analysis courses up to the year of his death. Vinti (2007, p. 908) gives a complete list of Emilio Baiada's doctoral students.

=== Research activity ===
Studioso del calcolo delle variazioni e di altri problemi che hanno trovato spazio in numerose pubblicazioni.

— Francesco Barbieri and Ferdinando Taddei, (Barbieri & Taddei 2006, p. 65).

He published more than 60 papers on differential equations, Fourier series, series expansion of orthonormal functions, topology of varieties, real analysis, calculus of variations and on the theory of functions.

== Selected publications ==
- Baiada, Emilio (1939), "Osservazioni sulla misurabilita secondo Caratheodory." [Observations on measurability according to Caratheodory], Annali della Scuola Normale Superiore, Serie II (in Italian), 8 (1): 69–74, JFM 65.0199.02, MR 1556817, Zbl 0020.10803.
- Baiada, Emilio (1951), "L'area delle superficie armoniche quale funzione delle rappresentazioni del contorno" [The area of harmonic surfaces as a function of their contour representations] (PDF), Rivista di Matematica della Università di Parma, (1) (in Italian), 2: 315–330, MR 0047125, Zbl 0044.28102.
- Morse, Marston; Baiada, Emilio (1953), "Homotopy and homology related to the Schoenflies problem", Annals of Mathematics, 2, 58: 142–165, doi:10.2307/1969825, MR 0056922, Zbl 0052.19902.
- Baiada, Emilio (1969), "Convergenze in area e in variazione" [Area and variation convergence], in Ghizzetti, Aldo (ed.), Theory and Applications of Monotone Operators, Proceedings of the NATO Advanced Study Institute held in Venice, Italy, 7–30 June, 1968 (in Italian), Gubbio: Edizioni Oderisi, pp. 331–332. The summary of a seminar held by Baiada at a NATO Advanced Study Institute in Venezia.
