= VIBOT =

European Course in Computer Vision & Robotics

VIBOT is an abbreviation of VIsion and RoBOTics. It is a 2-year European Masters in Computer Vision and Robotics course, conducted by Heriot-Watt University in Edinburgh, Scotland, Universitat de Girona in Girona, Spain and Université de Bourgogne in Le Creusot, France. It started in 2006 as part of the European Commission's Erasmus Mundus programme.

== Introduction ==
VIBOT is a two-year Master Program in 3D Vision and Robotics accredited in 2006 by the European Commission in the framework of the Erasmus Mundus program, a co-operation and mobility program of the European Commission in the field of higher education in order to promote the European Union as a centre of excellence in learning around the world. It is the only Erasmus Mundus Master Program in 3D Vision and Robotics among the 103 Erasmus Mundus Master Programs accredited since 2004 in all disciplines.

VIBOT Master students have courses in the three collaborating universities: Université de Bourgogne in France, University of Girona in Spain and Heriot-Watt University in Scotland. They spend one semester in each of these three universities and the fourth semester in training. The admission of the brightest students from all over the world, some of whom were already working in companies, allows to create an international and mobile educated workforce of high level for the European community.

VIBOT Master courses are given by faculties and visiting professors who belong to well-known research laboratories that have long-standing reputation for high quality research. The courses start from a comprehensive coverage of the prerequisites in the field of digital imaging (hardware and software) and basic image processing algorithms, and end up with research level teaching of their applications in the fields of robotics, medical imaging and 3D vision systems. The close location of research laboratories on campus allows the faculties to involve students at all stages of research and offer them many opportunities to participate in state-of-the-art research work.

== Course structure ==
The Masters Course is divided in four semesters, each having a value of 30 ECTS. All the courses are taught in English in the three partner universities. However, the order in which the students attend the universities has changed from the first generation to the second generation of the program. Irrespective of the generation, the last semester consists of a training period, which is an introduction to research carried out in one of the laboratories of the (wider) network.

=== First generation ===
The so-called VIBOT first generation comprises the first five promotions of the program (promotions starting from 2006 to 2010). For this primer generation, the mobility order was the following: Scotland, Spain, France.

The first semester was carried out on the campus of Heriot Watt University in Scotland (UK). Its constituting modules covered an introduction to signal and image processing, as well as the key related area of artificial intelligence. These subjects were supplemented by local culture studies, and training for drafting documents in English.

The second semester took place in the Universitat de Girona, in Catalunya, Spain. Topics were currently highly relevant to scientific and industrial communities like the segmentation strategies, object recognition and description, the acquisition of 3D information, and the application of hardware for specific real time applications. This semester covered: fundamentals on robotics, autonomous robots, scene segmentation and interpretation, visual perception, real time image processing and study of the local culture.

The third semester was hosted by the university Center Condorcet in Le Creusot, which is a delocalization of the Université de Bourgogne. The subjects covered were: pattern recognition, image analysis (including the problems of multiresolution analysis and deconvolution). These modules were supplemented by the study of various types of image modalities such as: infra-red, ultrasonic, radio-isotopique and X-ray imagery, with an emphasis on their application to medical imagery. A module of local culture was also provided.

=== Second generation ===
The VIBOT second generation starts in 2011 with the sixth promotion and is expected to last at least for five promotions. The main changes consist in the mobility order. Unlike the first generation, the second generation spends the semesters in the following order: France, Spain, Scotland. The overall objective is to start from science fundamentals and low-level image processing, then to introduce mid-level image processing, computer vision and applications in medical imaging, and to end with robotics and high-level integration so that the main methods and algorithms in the state-of-art of computer vision and robotics (through both a theoretical and applied point of view) are covered.

The organization of the semesters is as follows. An induction week is organized starting the first semester, in September, in Le Creusot during which the enrolled students are informed about the program, the assessment and the rules. The induction week also permits new students to meet second-year students or former VIBOT students. The first semester is held at Universite de Bougogne (UB) where the modules of Fundamentals on image processing, sensors and acquisition, as well as mathematics and computer science are taught. The second semester is hosted at Universitat de Girona (UdG) with subjects as improvements on image processing and pattern recognition, complements on computer vision and medical imaging and an introduction to robotics. The third semester is developed at Heriot-Watt University (HWU), and more advanced courses related to methods and high-level processing for real-time implementation and integration of vision and robotics are taught.

=== Training period ===
The training period in research corresponds to the fourth semester of the course. The laboratories belonging to the consortium of universities are the laboratories where the students are initially expected to do the training period. These laboratories are: Vision, Image and Signal Processing (VISP) and Ocean Systems Laboratory (OSL) in Heriot-Watt University, the laboratory for Computer Vision and Robotics (VICOROB) at the Universitat de Girona, and the Laboratory of Electronics, Informatics and Image (Le2i) in Le Creusot. However, the training period can also take place in any validated host laboratory or research center throughout the world. The laboratories concerned belong to the worldwide research networks which the participating institutes have jointly developed through the international-class research activities of their laboratories. Some of the laboratories where some previous students have done their research fourth semester are: Honda Research Institute Europe GmbH (Offenbach am Main, Germany), Erasmus University Rotterdam (Rotterdam, Netherlands), Laboratory for Analysis and Architecture of Systems LAAS-CNRS (Toulouse, France), the French National Institute for Research in Computer Science and Control INRIA (Grenoble, France), Toshiba Medical Visualization Systems Europe (Edinburgh, UK), Information and Communication Technologies (Queensland, Australia), SeeByte, Germany's National Research Center for Aeronautics and Space DLR (Wessling, Germany), the Computational Vision and Robotics Laboratory CVRL (Crete, Greece), Fraunhofer Institutes (Germany) among others.

== VIBOT days ==
VIBOT Day 2008 was held in Le Creusot, France, on September 9, 2008. It was a one-day event during which participants learned more about the VIBOT Master program and the collaborative opportunities that were offered to companies wishing to sponsor the program. Participants also attended several oral and poster presentations given by newly graduated students that raised their awareness of the academic excellence of the students as well as the high level of the courses taught in the program. Moreover, the one-day event also gave an opportunity for participants to meet and discuss with past, current and future international students.

VIBOT Day 2009 was held at Heriot-Watt University Post-Graduate School, Edinburgh, UK, on June 19, 2009. It was a one-day event during which there were oral and poster presentations. The collaborative opportunities with different companies were also exposed.

VIBOT Day 2010 was held at the Science and Technology Park of the University of Girona in Spain during June 2010.

Vibot Day 2011 will be held also at the University of Girona on June 16, 2011.

Vibot Day 2012 was held again at the Science and Technology Park of the University of Girona during June 2012.

== See also ==
- Université de Bourgogne
- Universitat de Girona
- Heriot-Watt University
