= Tenore =

Tenore can refer to:

- Tenor, voice part, used especially in reference to Italian opera
- Baritone horn, brass instrument, Italian name used in scores
- Michele Tenore (1780–1861), Italian botanist
- Vincenzo Tenore (1825–1886), Italian botanist
- Tenore, stream of Lombardy, in Italy
