= Tinelli =

Tinelli is a surname. Notable people with the surname include:

- Loris Tinelli (born 1999), Luxembourger footballer
- Marcelo Tinelli (born 1960), Argentine TV host, media producer, and businessman
- Tiberio Tinelli (1586–1639), Italian painter

== See also ==
- Fiore e Tinelli, an Italian television series
- Tonelli (surname)
