= Tonello =

Tonello is an Italian surname. Notable bearers include:

- Alfred Tonello, French cyclist
- Fabrizio Tonello, Italian scientist
- Michael Tonello, American journalist
- Raffael Tonello, Italian football player

== See also ==
- Tonelli
