= Archibald Chisholm =

British executive and journalist

Archibald Chisholm CBE
- Born: Archibald Hugh Tennent Chisholm; 17 August 1902
- Died: 22 November 1992 (aged 90)
- Father: Hugh Chisholm
- Relatives: Grace Chisholm Young (aunt); William Henry Young (uncle); Laurence Chisholm Young (cousin); Rosalind Tanner (cousin)

Archibald Hugh Tennent Chisholm (/ˈtʃɪzəm/ CHIZ-əm; August 17, 1902 – November 22, 1992) was a British oil executive and journalist who was editor of the Financial Times between 1937 and 1940.

== Early life ==
Chisholm was born in 1902. His parents were Hugh Chisholm, the editor of the 1911 edition of the Encyclopædia Britannica and city editor of The Times, and Eliza Chisholm (née Harrison). Chisholm attended Westminster School and subsequently graduated from Christ Church, Oxford. He played football at Christ Church and later claimed to have played tennis with Helen Wills-Moody. Chisholm was also a member of the Marylebone Cricket Club (MCC).

== Oil industry ==
Chisholm joined the Anglo-Persian Oil Company in 1928. The Kuwait Oil Company was formed in 1934 and the initial agreement with the Kuwaitis was signed by the Kuwaiti Emir Ahmad Al-Jaber Al-Sabah with the geologist Frank Holmes representing the Gulf Oil Corporation and Chisholm representing the Anglo-Persian Oil Company. Their initial agreement had been reached in December 1933 after Traders Ltd. under George Lloyd, 1st Baron Lloyd and Lord Glenconner, who had been in secret negotiations with the emir, were forced out by the new consortium of Holmes's Gulf Oil and Chisholm's Anglo Persian. Chisholm's request to be transferred to London was denied and he subsequently resigned from Anglo Persian in 1936. In 1975, he published a history of the early days of the Kuwaiti oil industry; The First Kuwait Oil Concession Agreement: A Record of the Negotiations 1911-1934.

Chisholm returned to the oil industry after the Second World War and was part of the delegation to the International Court of Justice that argued the case of BP following the nationalization of the Iranian oil industry in 1951. He remained part of BP until 1962 and subsequently served as an adviser to the company until 1972.

== Journalism and Second World War ==
His journalistic career began after his graduation, and he spent two years as a correspondent in London and New York for the Wall Street Journal.

After the oil industry, Chisholm returned to journalism as a leader writer for the Financial Times and became its editor in 1937; a position he held until 1940. It was under Chisholm's editorship that the first City of London gossip column of financial news was created, called "Men and Matters".

Chisholm joined the British Army in 1940 during the Second World War, serving in intelligence in the Middle East. Chisholm had attained the rank of Colonel by the end of the war and was Mentioned in dispatches twice. He became friends with the novelist Alec Waugh during his intelligence work in the war and the pair would frequently dine at the MCC in later years.

He received the CBE as part of the Military Division in the 1946 New Year Honours.

Chisholm married Josephine Goudge; they married at St John-at-Hampstead in October 1939. The couple had a daughter and son. Goudge died in 1983. Chisholm moved to No. 4 Gainsborough Gardens in Hampstead in 1947. The Times wrote in his obituary that Chisholm was 'Tall, distinguished, scholarly [and] urbane" and that he was "never happier" than when he entertained friends in The Savoy Grill, with each meal there starting with pink champagne.

== Selected publications ==
- The First Kuwait Oil Concession Agreement: A Record of the Negotiations 1911-1934 (1975)
