= E. W. Hobson =

English mathematician (1856–1933)

E. W. Hobson FRS
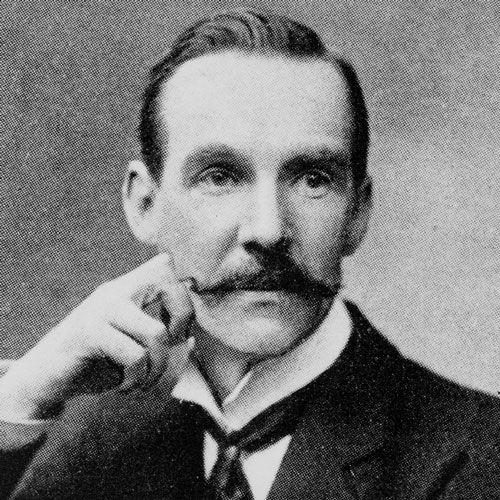
- Ernest William Hobson (1856–1933)
- Born: Ernest William Hobson; 27 October 1856; Derby, England
- Died: 19 April 1933 (aged 76); Cambridge, England
- Education: Royal School of Mines; Christ's College, Cambridge
- Known for: Real analysis
- Awards: Royal Medal (1907); De Morgan Medal (1920)
- Scientific career
- Fields: Mathematician
- Workplaces: Christ's College, Cambridge
- Academic advisors: Edward Routh
- Doctoral students: Rosalind Tanner
- Other notable students: Philippa Fawcett; John Maynard Keynes

Ernest William Hobson (27 October 1856 – 19 April 1933) was an English mathematician, now remembered mostly for his books, some of which broke new ground in their coverage in English of topics from mathematical analysis. He was Sadleirian Professor of Pure Mathematics at the University of Cambridge from 1910 to 1931.

== Life ==
He was born in Derby, and was educated at Derby School, the Royal School of Mines, and Christ's College, Cambridge, graduating Senior Wrangler in 1878. He was the brother of the economist John A. Hobson. He became a Fellow of Christ's almost immediately after graduation. He made his way into research mathematics only gradually, becoming an expert in the theory of spherical harmonics.

His 1907 work on real analysis was something of a watershed in the British mathematical tradition; and was lauded by G. H. Hardy. It included material on general topology and Fourier series that was topical at the time; and included mistakes that were noticed later (for example by R. L. Moore).

From 1924 to 1927, Robert Pollock Gillespie studied under him.

He is buried in the Parish of the Ascension Burial Ground in Cambridge, with his wife Seline, born 25 March 1860, died 10 June 1940, by whom he had four sons, one of whom Walter William (1894–1930) is buried with them in the same grave.

== Works ==
- A Treatise on Trigonometry (1891)
- Theory of Functions of a Real Variable (1907)
- Hobson, E. W. (1921) [1907], The theory of functions of a real variable and the theory of Fourier's series. Vol. I (2nd ed.), Cambridge University Press, MR 0092828
- Hobson, E. W. (1926) [1907], The theory of functions of a real variable and the theory of Fourier's series. Vol. II (2nd ed.), Cambridge University Press, MR 0092829
  - Vol. I, 3rd edition (1927)
- Mathematics, from the points of view of the Mathematician and of the Physicist (1912)
- Squaring the Circle (1913)
- John Napier and the Invention of Logarithms, 1614 (1914)
- The Domain of Natural Science (1923) Gifford Lectures
- The Theory of Spherical and Ellipsoidal Harmonics (1931)

== See also ==
- Tonelli–Hobson test
- Symmetry of second derivatives
- Squaring the circle
