= Grace Chisholm Young =

English mathematician (1868–1944)

- Born: Grace Emily Chisholm; 15 March 1868; Haslemere, Surrey, England
- Died: 29 March 1944 (aged 76); Croydon, Surrey, England
- Education: Girton College, Cambridge; University of Göttingen
- Spouse: William Henry Young (m. 1896; died 1942)
- Children: 6, including Laurence Chisholm Young and Rosalind Tanner
- Relatives: Hugh Chisholm (brother); Archibald Chisholm (nephew)
- Scientific career
- Fields: Mathematics
- Thesis: Algebraisch-gruppentheoretische Untersuchungen zur sphärischen Trigonometrie (Algebraic Groups of Spherical Trigonometry) (1895)
- Doctoral advisor: Felix Klein

Grace Chisholm Young (née Chisholm /ˈtʃɪzəm/ CHIZ-əm, 15 March 1868 – 29 March 1944) was an English mathematician. She was educated at Girton College, Cambridge, England and continued her studies at Göttingen University in Germany, where in 1895 she received a doctorate. Her early writings were published under the name of her husband, William Henry Young, and they collaborated on mathematical work throughout their lives. She was awarded the Gamble Prize for Mathematics by Girton College in 1915 for her work on calculus.

== Early life ==
Grace Chisholm was born on 15 March 1868 to Anna Louisa Bell and Henry Williams Chisholm. She was the youngest of four children. One of her brothers was the journalist and the editor of Encyclopaedia Britannica, Hugh Chisholm. Her father was a senior civil servant, with the title Warden of the Standards in charge of the Weights and Measures Department. Shortly before her father's retirement in 1877, the family settled in Haslemere. Up until the age of 10, Chisholm's was taught by her mother at home. From the age of 10, a governess was engaged for her. She passed the Cambridge Senior Examination in December 1885. Her family encouraged her to pursue social work amongst the poor in London. Chisholm wished to pursue further education; although she wanted to study medicine, her mother would not permit this, so, supported by her father, she decided to study mathematics.

== Education ==
Chisholm entered Girton College in 1889, four years after she passed the Cambridge Senior Examination, having been awarded the Sir Francis Goldsmid Scholarship by the college. At that time, Girton was not a constituent college of the University of Cambridge but was associated with it, with men and women graded on separate but related lists. At the end of her first year, when the Mays list came out, she was top of the Second class immediately below Isabel Maddison.

In 1892, Chisholm passed Part 1 of her final examinations with the equivalent of a first-class degree, ranked between 23 and 24 relative to 112 men. She also took (unofficially, on a challenge, with Isabel Maddison) the examinations for the Final Honours School in mathematics at the University of Oxford in 1892 in which she out-performed all the Oxford students. As a result, she became the first person to obtain a First class degree at both Oxford and Cambridge Universities in any subject (although they were not awarded formally).

Chisholm remained at Cambridge for an additional year to complete Part II of the Mathematical Tripos, in the hope of being able to follow an academic career.

She wanted to continue her studies and since women were not yet admitted to graduate schools in England she went to the University of Göttingen in Germany to study with Felix Klein. This was one of the major mathematical centres in the world. She had already learnt the German language. The decision to admit her had to be approved by the Berlin Ministry of Culture and was part of an experiment in admitting women to university studies. In 1895, at the age of 27, Chisholm was awarded a doctorate in mathematics. Again, government approval had to be obtained to allow her to take the examination, which consisted of probing questions by several professors on topics such as geometry, differential equations, physics, astronomy, and the area of her dissertation, all in German. She was also required to take courses demonstrating a broader knowledge, as well as to prepare a thesis which was entitled Algebraisch-gruppentheoretische Untersuchungen zur sphärischen Trigonometrie (Algebraic Groups of Spherical Trigonometry).

== Research ==
After returning to England in 1896, she resumed research she had initiated at Gӧttingen into an equation to determine the orbit of a comet. Her husband continued his work coaching in mathematics. However, in 1897 they both returned to Gӧttingen, encouraged by Felix Klein. Both attended advanced lectures and while she continued her mathematical research her husband started to work creatively for the first time. They visited Turin in Italy to study modern geometry and under Klein's guidance they began to work in the new area of set theory. From about 1901, the Youngs began to publish papers together. These concerned the theory of functions of a real variable and were heavily influenced by new ideas with which she had come into contact with in Gӧttingen. In 1908 they moved to Geneva in Switzerland where she continued to be based while her husband held a series of academic posts in India and the UK.

Although most of their work was published jointly, it is believed that Grace did much of the actual writing, and she also produced independent work which, according to expert opinion, was deeper and more important than her husband's. In total, they published 214 papers and four books. She began to publish in her own name in 1914, and was awarded the Gamble Prize for Mathematics by Girton College for an essay On infinite derivates in 1915. This work was stimulated by developments in microscopy that allowed real molecular motion to be viewed. Her work between 1914 and 1916 on relationships between derivatives of an arbitrary function contributed to the Denjoy-Young-Saks theorem.

They also wrote an elementary geometry book (The First Book of Geometry, 1905) which was translated into 4 languages. In 1906 the Youngs published The Theory of Sets of Points, the first textbook on set theory.

== Personal life ==
William Henry Young had been Chisholm's tutor for one term at Cambridge and they became friends after she sent him a copy of her doctoral thesis. They were married in June 1896 in London and initially lived in Cambridge. Their first child, Frank Chisholm Young, was born in 1897. They had a total of six children over a nine-year period.

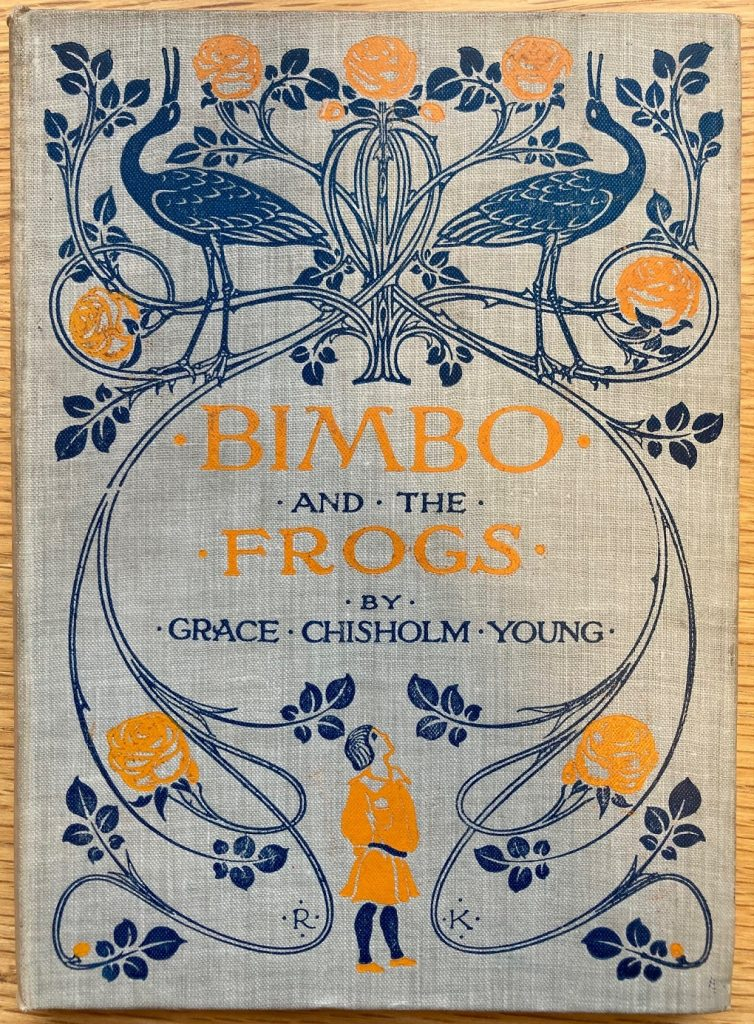
Book Bimbo and the frogs, designed by Alice B. Woodward

In addition to her career as a pioneering woman in what was then a discipline with significant barriers to entry, she completed all the requirements for a medical degree except the internship. She also learned six languages and taught each of her children a musical instrument. In addition, she published two books for children (Bimbo: A Little Real Story for Jill and Molly (1905) and Bimbo and the Frogs: Another Real Story (1907) — Bimbo was the nickname the Youngs gave their son Frank). The former book aimed to explain to children where babies came from while the latter was about cells. The Youngs' book on elementary geometry, The First Book of Geometry (1905), was inspired by the education of their son. In 1929, she began writing a historical novel, The Crown of England, set in the sixteenth century; she worked on this for five years, but it was never published.

With the approach of World War II, she left Switzerland in 1940 to take two of her grandchildren to England. She intended to return immediately, but could not do so because of the fall of France. This left William alone in Switzerland where he died in 1942. Grace Young died two years later at the home of her daughter, Janet, in Croydon.

Of their six children, three continued on to study mathematics (including Laurence Chisholm Young and Cecilia Rosalind Tanner), one daughter (Janet) became a physician, and one son (Patrick) became a chemist and pursued a career in finance and business. Their eldest son (Frank) was killed in World War I, when his plane was shot down in 1917, and his death had a profound effect on his parents, reducing their mathematical creativity. One of Grace's fourteen grandchildren, Sylvia Wiegand (daughter of Laurence), is a mathematician at the University of Nebraska–Lincoln and is a past president of the Association for Women in Mathematics.

== Legacy ==
In 1996 Young's granddaughter Sylvia Wiegand and her husband Roger established a fellowship for graduate student research at the University of Nebraska–Lincoln in honor of her grandparents, called the Grace Chisholm Young and William Henry Young Award.

== Publications ==
- Chatterji, Srishti Dhar; Wefelscheid, Heinrich, eds. (2000), Selected papers of Grace Chisholm Young and William Henry Young, Enseignement des mathématiques, Lausanne: Presses Polytechniques et Universitaires Romandes, pp. ix+870, ISBN 978-2-88074-445-8, MR 1781670, Zbl 0947.01020

== See also ==
- Denjoy–Young–Saks theorem
