= Accademia Pontaniana =

Coordinates: 40.85299°N 14.24789°E

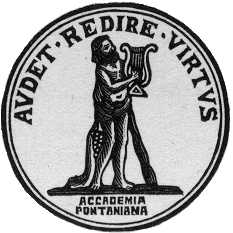
- logo of the Accademia Pontaniana
- Motto: AUDET REDIRE VIRTUS
- Founders: Antonio Beccadelli; Giovanni Pontano
- Established: 1443
- Chair: Luciano Carbone
- Formerly called: Accademia Alfonsina; Accademia Antoniana; Società Pontaniana
- Location: Via Mezzocannone 8, Napoli; Italy
- Interactive map of Accademia Pontaniana
- Website: http://www.accademiapontaniana.it/

The Accademia Pontaniana was the first academy in the modern sense, as a learned society for scholars and humanists and guided by a formal statute. Patronized by Alfonso V of Aragon, it was founded by the poet Antonio Beccadelli in Naples during the revival of classical learning and later led by Giovanni Pontano who gave it a more official character to the meetings.

== History ==
The Accademia Antoniana as it was first called, was founded in 1458, but its origins dates back to 1443 in an academic circle around the Neapolitan scholar and poet Antonio Beccadelli. This circle met informally in the Castel Nuovo of Alfonso V of Aragon. After the death of Beccadelli in 1471 these meetings were overseen by Giovanni Pontano, hence the name Accademia Pontaniana.

During its centuries-old history, the Academy was closed twice. The first closure was in 1542 by the Spanish viceroy of Naples Pedro Álvarez de Toledo, Marquis of Villafranca, as part of his harsh policy of "spagnolizzazione" ("Spanish-ization"). Revived in December 1808, and officially recognized by Royal Decree as an academy in 1825, it was again suppressed by the Fascist government in 1934 and its library burned in 1943. The Academy was restored by decree on 19 February 1944.

Benedetto Croce was the President of the Academy from 1917 to 1923.

== Structure ==
Today the activities of the Accademia Pontaniana includes meetings, reports and competitions. It has five divisions:

- Pure and Applied Mathematics
- Natural Science
- Science and Morals
- History, Archeology and Philology
- Literature and Fine Arts

Each class is composed of 20 regular members resident in Naples, 10 ordinary members and 20 foreign corresponding members.

The Academy publishes many series, including the "Atti dell'Accademia Pontaniana", as well as the annual "Quaderni della Accademia Pontaniana".

== Prizes awarded by the Academy ==
=== Tenore prize ===
The "Premio Tenore" was founded by Michele Tenore in 1853. On the session of the 26th of June 1955 the Academy resolved to honour him by continuing to award it, establishing the rules to be followed for the awarding. It is reserved only to Italian citizens; however, ordinary resident members are excluded from the competition. The prize is awarded every five years, by one of the five divisions in turn, to the author of a work on a topic chosen freely by the division. If the prize is not awarded when due, it can be awarded the following year by the same class.

==== Former prize winners ====
- Francesco Tricomi (1923)
- Mauro Picone (1927)
- Federico Cafiero (1953)

=== Cavolini–De Mellis prize ===
The "Premio Cavolini–De Mellis" was established in execution of a testament legacy of Baron Vincenzo De Mellis: the prize is named after an ancestor of Baron De Mellis, the naturalist Filippo Cavolini.

== Notable members ==
- Giuseppina Aliverti, geophysicist.
- Federico Cafiero, mathematician.
- Benedetto Croce, philosopher and former president.
- Rosanna Sornicola, linguist.
- Michele Tenore, botanist and former president.
