= Rosalind Tanner =

German historian of mathematics

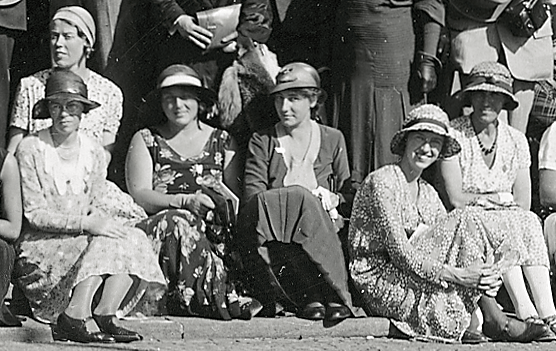
- R. C. H. Young (left, upper) at the ICM 1932
- Born: Rosalind Cecilia Hildegard Young; 5 February 1900; Göttingen, German Empire
- Died: 24 November 1992 (aged 92); Mayday Hospital, Croydon
- Education: University of Lausanne; Girton College, Cambridge
- Spouse: William Tanner
- Parents: William Henry Young (father); Grace Chisholm Young (mother)
- Relatives: Laurence Chisholm Young (brother); Hugh Chisholm (uncle); Archibald Chisholm (cousin)
- Scientific career
- Fields: Mathematics
- Thesis: Foundations for the Generalisation of the Theory of Stieltjes' Integration and of the Theory of Length, Area and Volume: An $n$-Dimensional Treatment (1929)
- Doctoral advisor: E. W. Hobson

Rosalind Cecilia Hildegard Tanner (née Young, 5 February 1900 – 24 November 1992) was a mathematician and historian of mathematics. She was the eldest daughter of the mathematicians Grace and William Young.

== Life ==
She was born and lived in Göttingen in Germany (where her parents worked at the university) until 1908. During her life she used the name Cecily.

Rosalind entered the University of Lausanne in 1917 as an undergraduate. She also helped her father's research between 1919 and 1921 at the University College Wales in Aberystwyth, and worked with Edward Collingwood, also of Aberystwyth, on a translation of Georges Valiron's course on Integral Functions. She received a Licence ès sciences (mathématique et physique), a bachelor's degree, from Lausanne in 1925.

She then studied at Girton College, Cambridge, gaining a PhD in 1929 under the supervision of Professor E. W. Hobson for research on Stieltjes integration. She accepted a teaching post at Imperial College, London where she worked until 1967.

After 1936, most of her research was in the history of mathematics, and she had a particular interest in Thomas Harriot, an Elizabethan mathematician. She set up the Harriot Seminars in Oxford and Durham. Rosalind married William Tanner in 1953; however, he died a few months after their marriage in 1954.

In 1972, she and Ivor Grattan-Guinness published a second edition of her parents' book The Theory of Sets of Points, originally published in 1906.

Rosalind Tanner died on 24 November 1992.
