= Parthenope University of Naples =

University in Italy

Coordinates: 40.8573°N 14.2762°E

- Università degli Studi di Napoli "Parthenope"
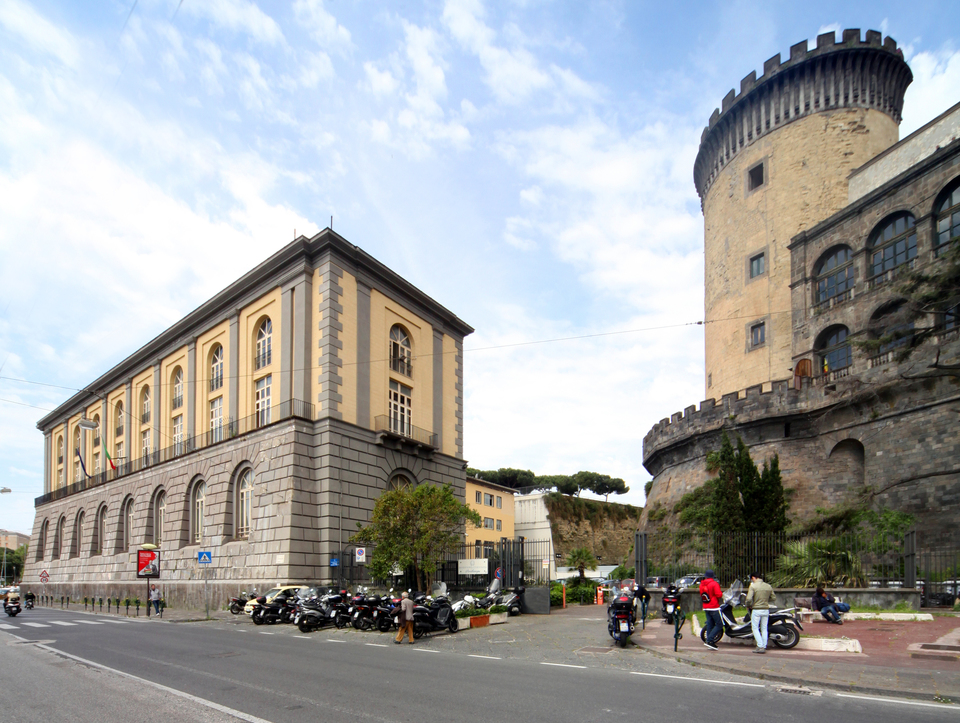
- Type: Public
- Established: 1930
- Rector: Antonio Garofalo
- Students: 15,000
- Location: Naples, Italy
- Sports teams: CUS Napoli
- Website: uniparthenope.it

The Parthenope University of Naples (Italian: Università degli Studi di Napoli "Parthenope") is one of the universities located in Naples, Italy.

== Historical notes ==
Now one of the fully accredited universities of Naples, the “Parthenope” University was founded in 1920 as the Regio Istituto Superiore Navale, that is, as the Royal Naval Technical Institute of the Kingdom of Italy. Initially, its purpose was to be a "support" institute for the promotion of studies aimed at improving maritime economy and naval technology.

In the 1930s it was further enlarged and improved, and its name was changed to Istituto Universitario Navale. It played a strategic role during Fascism: the University experts elaborated and calculated the exact and best air routes for the Oceanic trips performed by the Royal Italian Sea Planes, the "Trasvolata Atlantica". Several airplanes, leaving their base in Orbetello, arrived to New York City and, in a second trip, finally come to South America: it was a great technological and political success for the regime. Also, it was at the Istituto Universitario Navale that, during World War II, some scientist developed and realized the first Italian radar; unfortunately the political authorities did not understand the importance of such discovery, stopping the development and thus neglecting the possibility to produce such an instrument.

=== Notable personalities ===
- Giuseppina Aliverti (geophysicist): developed the Aliverti-Lovera method of measuring the radioactivity of water.
- Federico Cafiero (mathematician): worked as assistant professor to the chair of financial mathematics in 1944.
- Renato Caccioppoli (mathematician): worked as professor on the chair of mathematical analysis during the academic years 1942/43 and 1952/53.
- Carlo Miranda (mathematician): worked as professor on the chair of mathematical analysis during the academic years 1943/44 and 1955/56.
- Mauro Picone (mathematician): worked as professor on the chair of mathematical analysis during the academic year 1926/27.
- Mariano Errichiello, Scholar of Zoroastrianism at SOAS, University of London Shapoorji Pallonji Institute of Zoroastrian Studies

== The university campuses ==
The main premises of the “Parthenope” University are located directly in the front of the passenger port of Naples. Additionally, “Parthenope” has acquired classrooms buildings on the Posillipo coast and in the former church of San Giorgio dei Genovesi, located in the centre of Naples. An additional location at the new civic centre, the Centro Direzionale was launched in early 2000s. With the increased extension and completion of main facilities, merged with its final accreditation as a full university, the current student population of the Parthenope University is about 15,000 units. The buildings placed in via Parisi offer the courses and activities about Economic and Law subjects. The buildings located in via Acton and via Medina are temporarily set to Scienze Motorie activities and subjects. A project for the new Scienze Motorie venue is on the table and within a few years the activities will be scheduled around a new campus, therefore freeing the rooms in via Acton and via Medina with the aim of widening the Economic studies and letting the current activities of Economics and Laws be more breathable, it's known that they only relate to the rooms and offices is in via Parisi at the moment and this all would be binding if the University main field wants to push forward. Between 2024 and 2025 the venue in via Acton also became the reference point for foreign languages courses, mainly sticking to the improvement and the additional lessons about English and French. It is planned to open up for Ielts preparation exams and for some other cultural swaps.

Furthermore Parthenope University actually re-started teaching activities and exams in Nola, as a continuation of the legacy and cultural bond between the town and the University. Here's the know-how of the same top-notch professors and staff spread through various buildings dedicated to Economics, laws, Sports sciences and engineering. Economics faculty also gives its students the chance to graduate in one of the most important territories in the Vesuvian zone. As a result of recent decisions about requalification of another town that is struggling with social troubles and that keeps being struck by negative events, Sports Sciences will be offered in Caivano as well. It's the well-perceived message of creating value by sports and fostering a thriving future for younger generations whose ambition is eager.

== Organization ==
The university is divided into 5 departments:

- Economics (set in via Parisi)
- Engineering (set at Centro Direzionale)
- Law (set in via Parisi)
- Exercise and Sports Science (set in via Acton, via Medina and CUS)
- Sciences and Technology (set at Centro Direzionale)

== See also ==
- List of Italian universities
- Naples
