= Joaquim Salvi =

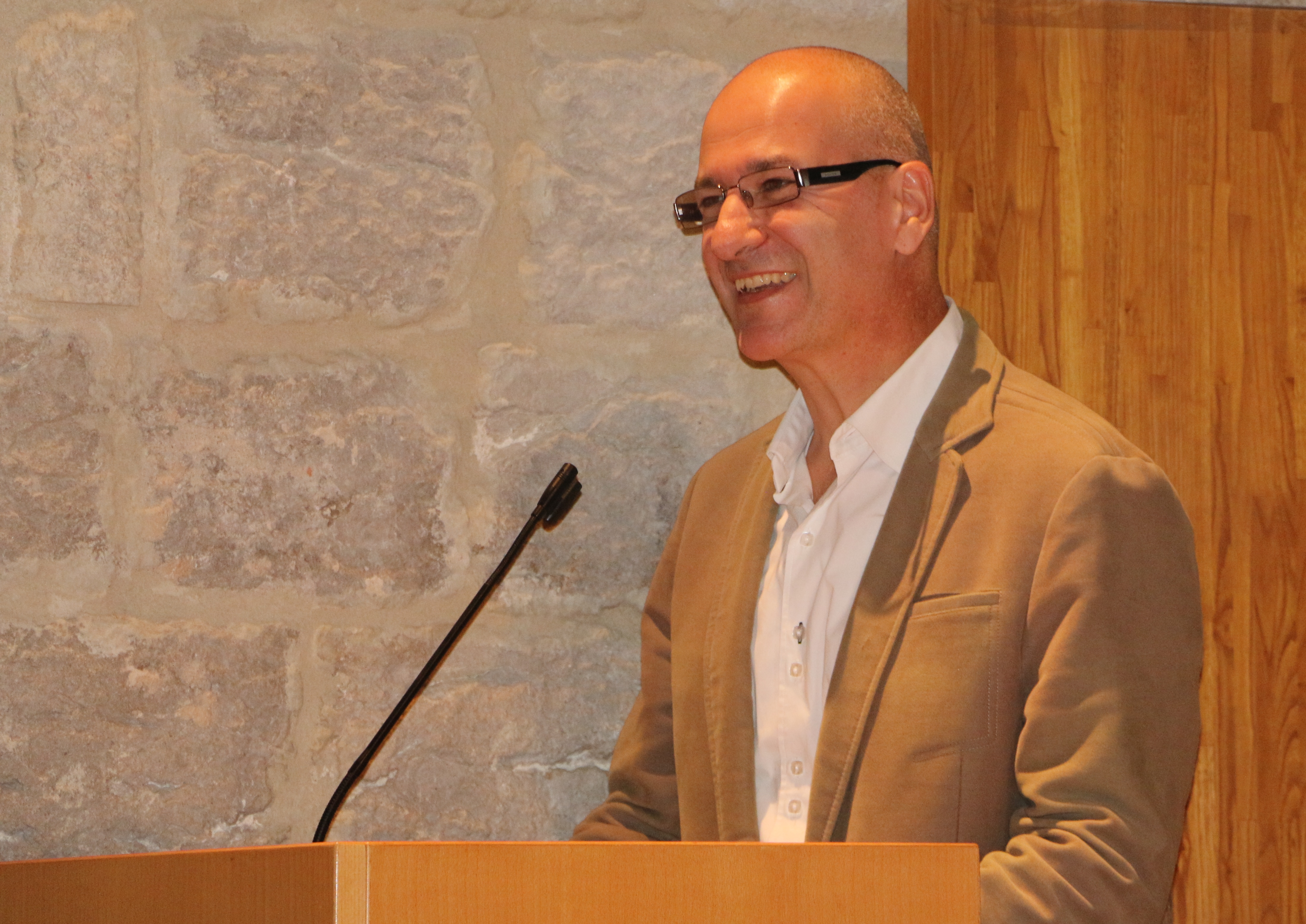
- Joaquim Salvi
- Born: Joaquim Salvi Mas; 1969 (age 56–57); Sant Feliu de Guíxols
- Occupation: University rector
- Known for: Rector of University of Girona (2017-)

Joaquim Salvi Mas is a Catalan engineer and professor, rector of the University of Girona since 2017.

== Trajectory ==
He holds a degree in Computer Science from the Polytechnic University of Catalonia and a PhD in Industrial Engineering - Extraordinary Engineering Award - from the University of Girona. He has served as a university professor in the Department of Computer Architecture and Technology and Researcher in the Computer Vision and Robotics research group, VICOROB, at the University of Girona. He has been a visiting professor at the Ocean Systems Lab of Heriot-Watt University (United Kingdom). He has been the Principal investigator of several competitive research and technology transfer projects in computer vision and underwater robotics at national and European levels.

He was a founding partner of the companies AQSense and BonesNotes. He was the director of the Polytechnic School of the University of Girona from 2011 to 2017.

He was elected rector of the University of Girona on November 30, 2017, and re-elected rector on November 26, 2021. Between February 2024 and January 2025, he was chairperson of the Catalan Association of Public Universities (ACUP); during his presidency, the Calonge Declaration was published, which defends public universities as engines of transformation, progress, and well-being at the service of the country.
