= Hugh Chisholm =

English editor and journalist (1866–1924)

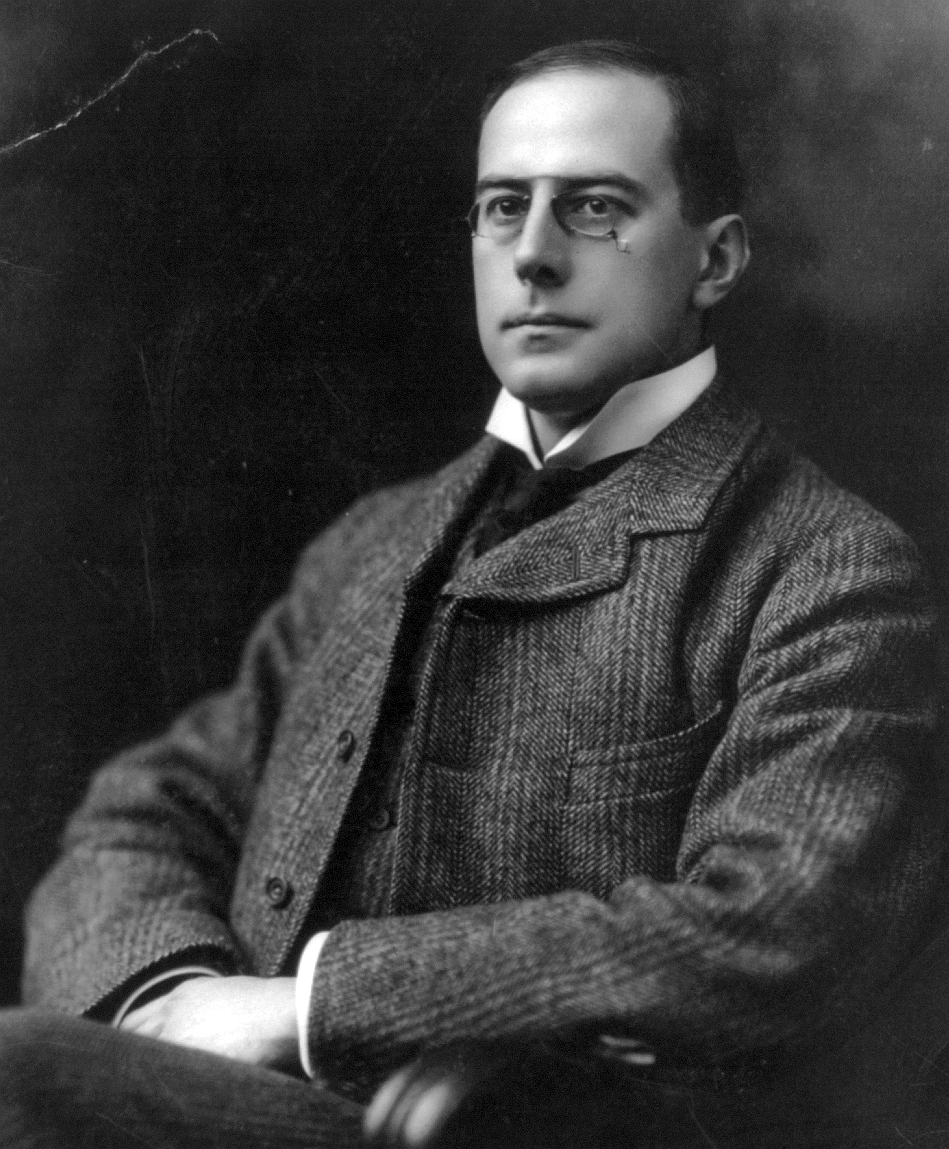
- Chisholm in 1903
- Born: 22 February 1866; London, England
- Died: 29 September 1924 (aged 58); London, England
- Education: Corpus Christi College, Oxford
- Occupations: Journalist and encyclopedia editor
- Known for: 10th, 11th, and 12th editions of the Encyclopædia Britannica
- Spouse: Eliza Beatrix Harrison (m. 1893)
- Children: 3, including Archibald
- Relatives: Grace Chisholm Young (sister); William Henry Young (brother-in-law); Laurence Chisholm Young (nephew); Rosalind Tanner (niece)

Hugh Chisholm (/ˈtʃɪzəm/ CHIZ-əm; 22 February 1866 – 29 September 1924) was a British journalist. He was the editor of the 10th, 11th and 12th editions of the Encyclopædia Britannica.

== Life ==
He was born in London, England, a son of Henry Williams Chisholm (1809–1901), Warden of the Standards at the Board of Trade, and his wife Anna Louisa Bell; the mathematician Grace Chisholm was his sister. He was educated at Felsted School and matriculated at Corpus Christi College, Oxford, in 1884, graduating in 1888 with a first class in literae humaniores. He was called to the bar at the Middle Temple in 1892.

Chisholm worked for The St James's Gazette as assistant editor from 1892 and was appointed editor in 1897. During these years, he also contributed numerous articles on political, financial and literary subjects to the weekly journals and monthly reviews, becoming well known as a literary critic and conservative publicist. He moved in 1899 to The Standard as chief leader-writer and moved in 1900 to The Times, to act as co-editor with Sir Donald Mackenzie Wallace and President Arthur Twining Hadley of Yale University on preparation of the eleven volumes forming the 10th edition of the Encyclopædia Britannica. In 1903, he became editor-in-chief for the 11th edition, which was completed under his direction in 1910, and published as a whole by the Cambridge University Press, in 29 volumes, in 1911. He subsequently planned and edited the Britannica Year-Book (1913).

Chisholm had been suggested as a replacement as editor of The Times as an alternative to Geoffrey Dawson. Lord Northcliffe, owner of The Times from 1909, promised him the post in 1911, but did not act on the promise, and Dawson continued to 1919.

In 1913, following his return from America overseeing the printing of The Britannica Year-Book, Chisholm was appointed day editor of The Times. His role included that of leader writer; but eventually he fell out with Northcliffe. In August 1913, he was appointed a director of the company. He was financial editor throughout World War I, resigning in 1920 when he embarked on the editorship of the three volumes forming the 12th edition of Encyclopædia Britannica, published in 1922.

== Family ==
In 1893, Chisholm married Eliza Beatrix Harrison, daughter of Henry Harrison of County Down. Together they had three sons. Their son Archibald Chisholm played a key role in the development of the oil industry in Kuwait and was editor of the Financial Times from 1937 to 1940.

== Sources ==
- The Times, 30 September 1924, p 14, Issue 43770, Col d. Obituary of Chisholm.
- Janet E. Courtney: An Oxford Portrait Gallery, (London) 1931, pp 167–157. Janet Courtney, née Hogarth, worked for The Times Book Club and was later responsible for the arrangement of the Index volume to the 11th and 12th editions of Encyclopædia Britannica.
- Anon, History of "The Times", Vol 3, 1884–1912 (1939), pp 121, 519, 755, 829
- Ibid, Vol 4, 1912–1920 (1947), pp 143, 137, 138, 208, 472
- Dictionary of National Biography, article "Hugh Chisholm"
