= Christina Eubanks-Turner =

American mathematician

- Born: New Orleans, Louisiana, U.S.
- Education: Xavier University of Louisiana, University of Nebraska–Lincoln
- Scientific career
- Fields: Commutative algebra, graph theory, mathematics education
- Workplaces: Loyola Marymount University
- Doctoral advisor: Sylvia Wiegand

Christina Eubanks-Turner is a professor of mathematics in the Seaver College of Science and Engineering at Loyola Marymount University (LMU). Her academic areas of interest include graph theory, commutative algebra, mathematics education, and mathematical sciences diversification. She is also the Director of the Master's Program in Teaching Mathematics at LMU.

== Early life and education ==
Eubanks-Turner was born and raised in New Orleans, Louisiana and enjoyed logic puzzles and creative thinking as a child. She received her B.S. cum laude from Xavier University of Louisiana, a historically black college, in 2002; she received her M.S. in 2004 and her Ph.D. in 2008—both from the University of Nebraska–Lincoln. Eubanks-Turner was one of the first two African Americans to receive a doctorate degree in mathematics from the University of Nebraska–Lincoln. Her dissertation explored the topic of "Prime ideals in low-dimensional mixed polynomial/power series rings." Eubanks-Turner's doctoral advisor was Sylvia Wiegand.

== Career and research ==
Eubanks-Turner was the first African American to receive tenure at LMU's College of Science and Engineering.

Her research areas include specialized mathematical training that teachers need to teach math at the undergraduate and secondary levels. Her pedagogy also includes the integration of equity issues into teaching and an approach to mathematics education that addresses the whole student. Her research in mathematics includes topics in graph theory and commutative algebra.

== Selected publications ==
- C. Eubanks-Turner, A. Li, Interlace Polynomials of Friendship Graphs, Electronic Journal of Graph Theory and Applications, Vol. 6 (2), (2018), 269–281.
- D. Berube, C. Eubanks-Turner, E. Mosteig, T. Zachariah, A Tale of Two Programs: Broadening Participation of Underrepresented Students in STEM at Loyola Marymount University, Journal of Research in STEM Education, Vol. 4(1), (2018), 13–22.
- B. Baker Swart, K. Beck, S. Crook, C. Eubanks-Turner, H. Grundman, M. Mei, L. Zack, Fixed points of augmented generalized happy functions, Rocky Mountain Journal of Mathematics, Vol. 48(1), (2018), 47–58.
- C. Eubanks-Turner, P. Beaulieu, N. Pal, Smooth Transition for Advancement to Graduate Education (STAGE) for Underrepresented Groups in Mathematical Sciences Pilot Project: The Benefits and Challenges of Mentoring, PRIMUS, 28:2, (2018), 97–117.
- C. Eubanks-Turner, M. Lennon, E. Reynoso, B. Thibodeaux, A. Urquiza, A. Wheatley, D. Young, Using the Division Algorithm to Decode Reed-Solomon Codes, Journal of Shanghai Normal University (Natural Sciences) (2015), 44:3, 262–269.
- C. Eubanks-Turner, N. Hajj, Mardi Gras Math, Mathematics Teaching in the Middle School (2015), 20:8, 494–498.
- C. Eubanks-Turner, A. Li, Graphical Properties of the Bipartite Graph of Spec(Z[x])\{0}, Journal of Algebra Combinatorics, Discrete Structures and Applications (2015), 2:1, 65–73.
- E. Celikbas, C. Eubanks-Turner, S. Wiegand, Prime Ideals in Power Series Rings and Polynomial Rings over Noetherian Domains, Recent Advances in Commutative Rings, Integer-Valued Polynomials, and Polynomial Functions, Springer (2014), 55–82.
