= Narcís Comadira =

Spanish painter, journalist and poet

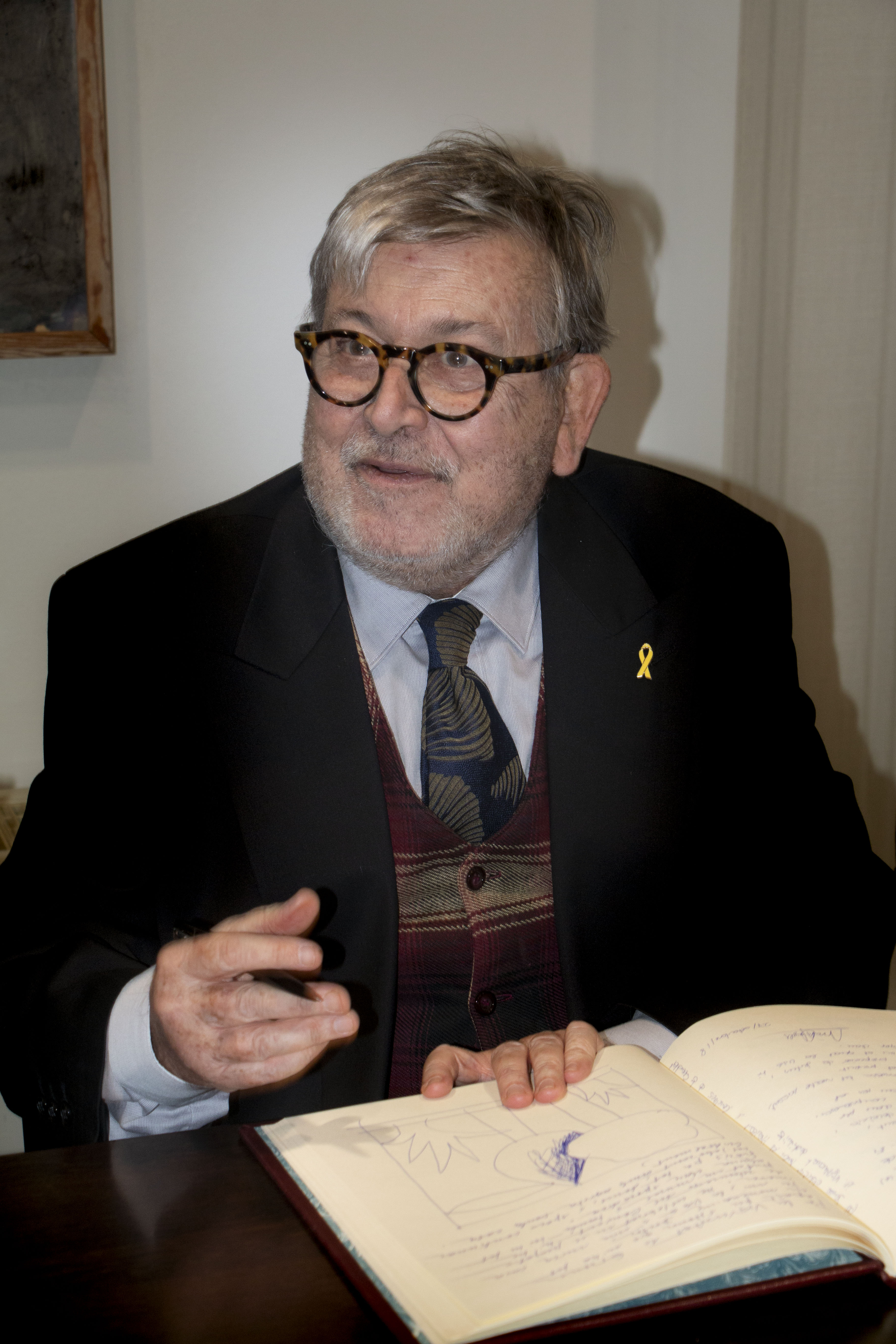

Narcís Comadira i Moragriega (born in Girona on January 22, 1942) is a Spanish poet, painter, playwright, translator, journalist and literary critic. His poetry is rather classical in nature, with a contemplative theme and a certain ironic point of view. As a painter, he understands his work as an extension of poetry. His first works show references to surrealism and pop culture, as well as his master Domènec Fita. In the late 70's he left the figurative painting to begin to represent nature and architecture, specializing in a very personal landscape and marked by realism, which in his latest work is leading to a synthesis of it, where fewer and fewer elements appear in his works.

In the Spanish municipal elections of 2015 he occupied the last position of the list of the Popular Unity Candidacy in Girona. In the 2015 elections to the Parliament of Catalonia, he was part of the electoral list of the Popular Unity Candidacy.

== Works ==
=== Narrative ===
- Girona. Matèria i memòria. Barcelona: Empúries, 1989.
- Gerona. Barcelona: Destino, 1990.
- Girona: retrat sentimental d'una ciutat. Barcelona: Edicions 62, 1998.

=== Poetry ===
- La febre freda, dins 5 poetes de Girona. Girona: Carles Pla Dalmau, 1966.
- Papers privats [pròleg de J. M. Valverde]. Barcelona: Eler, 1969.
- Amich de plor. [pròleg de Salvador Oliva]. Girona: Impr. Montserrat, 1970.
- Un passeig pels bulevards ardents. Barcelona: Revista Els Marges, 1974.
- El verd jardí. Barcelona: Vosgos, 1976.
- Les ciutats. Barcelona: Vosgos, 1976.
- Desdesig. Barcelona: Edicions 62, 1976.
- Terra natal. Barcelona: La Gaia Ciència, 1978.
- Àlbum de família. Barcelona: Quaderns Crema, 1980. (2ª ed., 2001)
- La llibertat i el terror. Poesia 1970-1980. Barcelona: Edicions 62, 1981.
- Rèquiem. Olot: Aubert impr, 1984.
- Enigma. Barcelona: Edicions 62, 1985. (2ª ed., 2001)
- En quarantena. Barcelona: Empúries, 1990.
- Usdefruit. Barcelona: Empúries, 1995.
- Poemes. Ciutat de Mallorca: Universitat de les Illes Balears, 1998.
- Recull de poemes i serigrafies. Barcelona: Col·legi de Doctors i Llicenciats, 1999.
- Lírica lleugera. Barcelona: Edicions 62 - Empúries, 2000.
- L'art de la fuga. Barcelona: Edicions 62 - Empúries, 2002.
- Formes de l'ombra. Poesies 1966 - 2002. Barcelona: Edicions 62 - Empúries, 2003.
- Llast. Barcelona: Edicions 62, 2007.
- Lent. Barcelona: Edicions 62, 2012.
- Manera negra. Barcelona: Edicions 62, 2018.
- Els moviments humans. Barcelona: Edicions 62, 2021.
- Antologies

=== Theatre ===
- La vida perdudable: un dinar. Neva: un te. Barcelona: Lumen, 1992.
- L'hora dels adéus. Barcelona: Lumen, 1996.
- El dia dels morts. Un oratori per a Josep Pla. Barcelona: Edicions 62, 1997.
- L'hort de les oliveres, premiered at Teatre Nacional de Catalunya during 2014–2015 season.

== Awards and honours ==
In 2013 he received the Creu de Sant Jordi by Catalan government and in 2018 he was honoured Doctors Honoris Causa by the University of Girona.
