= Standards Department =

The Standards Department was a department of the English Board of Trade having the custody of the imperial standards of weights and measures.

== History ==
As far back as can be traced, the standard weights and measures, the primary instruments for determining the justness of all other weights and measures used in the United Kingdom were kept at the Exchequer, and the duties relating to these standards were imposed upon the chamberlains of the Exchequer. The office of chamberlains was abolished in 1826 under the Receipt of the Exchequer Act 1783, however the custody of the standards and any duties connected to them remained attached to an officer in the Exchequer until that department was abolished by the Exchequer and Audit Departments Act 1866. Meanwhile, in pursuance of recommendations of Standard Commissions of 1841 and 1854 and a House of Commons committee of 1862, the Standards of Weights, Measures, and Coinage Act 1866 was passed. This act created a special department of the Board of Trade, called the Standard Weights and Measures Department, with a head of that department styled the Warden of the Standards. His duty was to conduct comparisons, verifications and operations with reference to the standards in aid of scientific research and otherwise.

== Directors ==
- Henry Williams Chisholm, warden of the standards (1866–1878), father of Hugh Chisholm and Grace Chisholm Young
- Henry James Chaney (March 1842–13 February 1906), superintendent of weights and measures (1878–1906)
