= Fabrizio Tonello =

Italian political scientist (born 1951)

Fabrizio Tonello (born 1951 in Venice) is Senior Scholar at University of Padua where he still teaches. He has taught Political Science, American History and Public opinion sciences. He has been Visiting Fellow of Columbia University in New York and a Fulbright Scholar at the University of Pittsburgh (PA).

He previously taught at the Communication studies department of University of Bologna and at the International School for Advanced Studies in Trieste.

== Selected Publications ==
- 1996, Da Saigon an Oklahoma City, Limina
- 1999, La nuova macchina dell'informazione, Feltrinelli
- 2003, La politica come azione simbolica, Franco Angeli
- 2005, Il giornalismo americano, Carocci
- 2006, Il giornalismo francese, Carocci (with Elisa Giomi)
- 2006, La fabbrica dei mostri book coupled with DVD Una storia americana, Feltrinelli
- 2007, Il nazionalismo americano, UTET
- 2010, La Costituzione degli Stati Uniti, Bruno Mondadori/Pearson
- 2012, L'età dell'ignoranza – È possibile una democrazia senza cultura?, Bruno Mondadori
- 2013, Moral Panic: The Issue of Women and Crime in Italian Evening News, "Sociologica", n.3 (with Elisa Giomi)
- 2017, Desolation Row. From Democracy to Oligarchy 1976-2016, Fondazione Feltrinelli
- 2018, We are sliding into uncharted territory, and we are alone in this. A New Look At Political Disorientation, "Review of International American Studies", vol. 11, n.2
- 2019, Democrazie a rischio, Bruno Mondadori/Pearson
- 2020a, Nazionalismo, in: Enciclopedia Italiana. Decima appendice, Istituto della Enciclopedia Italiana
- 2020b, Oligarchia, in: Enciclopedia Italiana. Decima appendice, Istituto della Enciclopedia Italiana
- 2022, How American Democracy Is Quickly Slipping Away, "Michigan Quarterly Review", vol. 62, n.4
- 2025, L'America in 18 quadri. Dalle piantagioni a Silicon Valley, Laterza
