= University of Girona =

Public university in Girona, Spain

Coordinates: 41°59′09″N 2°49′38″E

- Universitat de Girona
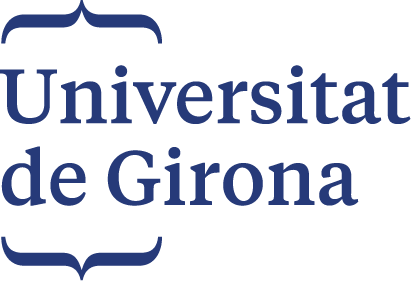
- Type: Public
- Established: 1446/1991
- Affiliations: Vives network
- Rector: Quim Salvi
- Students: over 15,000
- Undergraduates: 12,067
- Postgraduates: 835
- Doctoral students: 629
- Location: Girona, Catalonia, Spain
- Campus: Montilivi, Barri Vell, Centre and Parc Científic i Tecnològic
- Website: www.udg.edu

The University of Girona (Catalan: Universitat de Girona, UdG (IPA: [uniβəɾsiˈtad də ʒiˈɾonə]); Spanish: Universidad de Girona, UdG;) is located in the city of Girona, Catalonia, Spain.

Its real origin dates back to its creation in 1446, but it was reestablished as a new university in 1991. As of 2021, it consists of several campuses and buildings across Girona: Montilivi, Barri Vell, Centre, and Parc Científic i Tecnològic. A fifth campus, Campus de Ciències de la Salut, was proposed some time ago. Since its founding, the university has had five presidents (Catalan: rectors): Josep Maria Nadal i Farreras, from 1991 to 2002, Joan Batlle i Grabulosa from 2002 to 2005, Anna Maria Geli from 2005 to 2013, Sergi Bonet Marull from 2013 to 2017 and Joaquim Salvi since 2017 (still in office).

== Organization ==
=== Partnerships and strategic alliances ===
The UdG has partnered with other universities and research centers (including the University of the Balearic Islands and University of Perpignan Via Domitia) to create the Pyrenees-Mediterranean Cross-Border Research and Higher Education Group (PRES-PM).

The UdG has joined forces with the University of the Balearic Islands, the Catalan Institute for Water Research and the Consejo Superior de Investigaciones Científicas to create the Campus d'Excel.lència Pirineus-Mediterrània (CEI-PM).

It is a member of the Florence Network for Nursing and Midwifery and the Vives Network.

=== Internal decision-making ===
The Universitat de Girona uses the open-source software Consul to let its members propose, debate and decide on issues in administration, teaching and budgeting.

== History ==
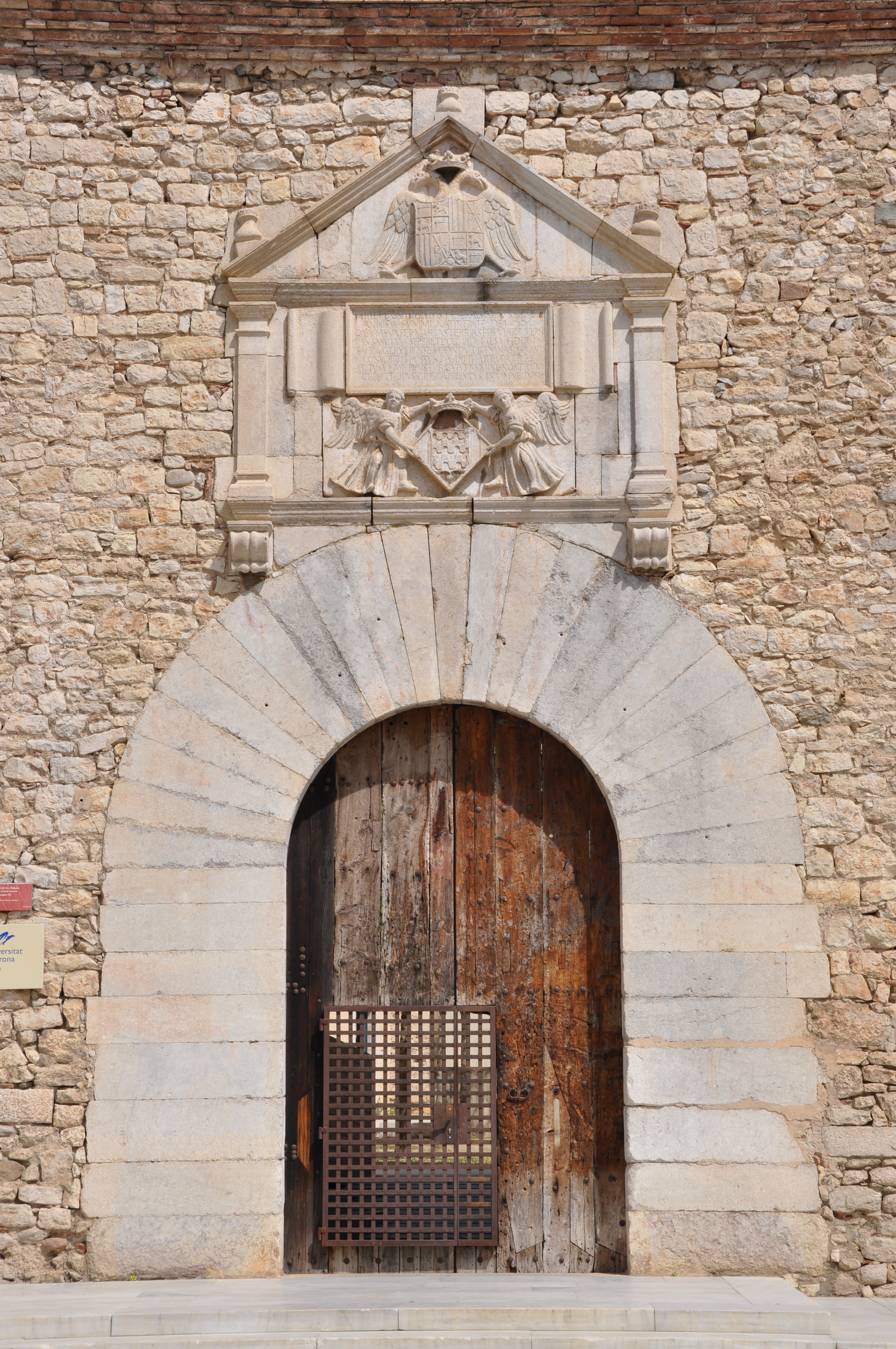
Main entrance of the "Building of the Eagles"

The first modern reference of Universitat de Girona references to the Escola Normal de Mestres and, specially, the initiative during the 1960s decade to recover university level studies in Girona. In 1969, the Col·legi Universitari de Girona and the Escola Politècnica Universitària de Girona were created, which depended on the already founded universities UAB and UPC, respectively. Later, the Estudi General was restarted, with the available studies of Humanities, Sciences, Economics and Social science. Finally, on 12 December 1991, the Catalan Parliament created the new and current Universitat de Girona.

== Research ==
Research at the UdG mainly focuses on two strategic lines: (1) water science and management, and (2) tourism and sustainability. Furthermore, the UdG pursues research in a few important research and innovation programmes that have attained a prominent role at the university: scientific research, the dissemination of its results and its ensuing social influence are also focussed on computer simulation and applications, food and agriculture, biomedicine, the quality of life and cultural heritage.

The University of Girona has 12 research institutes and academic personnel in 24 departments and 107 research groups (58 in science, technology and health fields and 49 in the humanities and social sciences).

== Doctors Honoris Causa by the University of Girona ==
- Jaume Aragall (1997)
- Fred M. Utter (1997)
- Jerome S. Bruner (1997)
- Miquel Batllori (2002)
- Juan Bertrán (2004)
- Jaume Gil Aluja (2004)
- Robert Brian Tate (2004)
- Raimon Panikkar (2008)
- Carmina Virgili (2008)
- Joan Rodés (2008)
- Eric Hobsbawn (2008)
- Miquel Roca Junyent (2008)
- Joan Roca Fontané (2011)
- Ferran Mir (2011)
- Encarna Roca (2012)
- Josef Havel (2012)
- George Steiner (2012)
- Josep Fontana Lázaro (2013)
- Ramon Garrabou Segura (2013)
- Jordi Nadal i Oller (2013)
- David Jou i Mirabent (2014)
- Juan Carlos Tedesco (2014)
- Ilona Kickbusch (2015)
- Pere Balsells i Jofre (2016)
- Lluís Llach i Grande (2017)
- Miquel Martí i Pol (posthumous promotion) (2017)
- Narcís Comadira i Moragriega (2018)
- Evert Jan Baerends (2019)
- Sovan Lek (2019)
- Josep Maria Casasús (2021)
- Daniella Tilbury (2021)

== See also ==
- Universities in Spain
