= Tonelli–Hobson test =

In mathematics, the Tonelli–Hobson test gives sufficient criteria for a function ƒ on R^{2} to be an integrable function. It is often used to establish that Fubini's theorem may be applied to ƒ. It is named for Leonida Tonelli and E. W. Hobson.

More precisely, the Tonelli–Hobson test states that if ƒ is a real-valued measurable function on R^{2}, and either of the two iterated integrals

$$\int_\mathbb{R}\left(\int_\mathbb{R}|f(x,y)|\,dx\right)\, dy$$

or

$$\int_\mathbb{R}\left(\int_\mathbb{R}|f(x,y)|\,dy\right)\, dx$$

is finite, then ƒ is Lebesgue-integrable on R^{2}.
