= Tonelli's theorem (functional analysis) =

Theorem

In mathematics, Tonelli's theorem in functional analysis is a fundamental result on the weak lower semicontinuity of nonlinear functionals on L^{p} spaces. As such, it has major implications for functional analysis and the calculus of variations. Roughly, it shows that weak lower semicontinuity for integral functionals is equivalent to convexity of the integral kernel. The result is attributed to the Italian mathematician Leonida Tonelli.

== Statement of the theorem ==
Let $\Omega$ be a bounded domain in $n$-dimensional Euclidean space $\Reals^n$ and let $f : \Reals^m \to \Reals \cup \{\pm \infty\}$ be a continuous extended real-valued function. Define a nonlinear functional $F$ on functions $u : \Omega \to \Reals^m$by
$$F[u] = \int_{\Omega} f(u(x)) \, \mathrm{d} x.$$

Then $F$ is sequentially weakly lower semicontinuous on the $L^p$ space $L^p(\Omega)$ for $1 < p < +\infty$ and weakly-∗ lower semicontinuous on $L^\infty(\Omega)$ if and only if $f$ is convex.

== See also ==
- Discontinuous linear functional
