= Leonida Tonelli =

Italian mathematician (1885–1946)

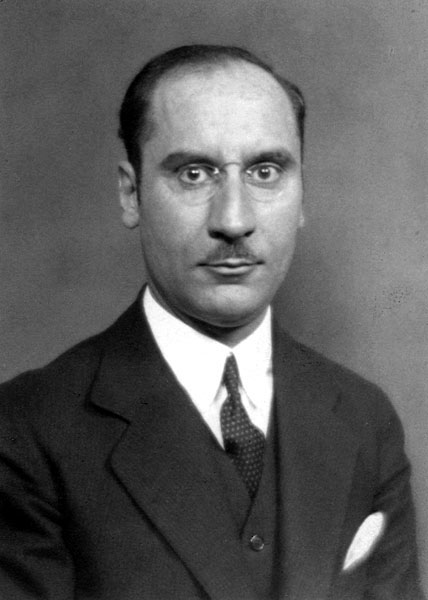
- Born: 19 April 1885; Gallipoli, Apulia, Italy
- Died: 12 March 1946 (aged 60); Pisa, Italy
- Education: University of Bologna
- Known for: Tonelli's theorem Tonelli's theorem (functional analysis); Tonelli–Hobson test
- Scientific career
- Fields: Mathematics
- Workplaces: University of Cagliari; University of Parma; University of Bologna; University of Pisa; Scuola Normale Superiore
- Doctoral advisor: Cesare Arzelà
- Doctoral students: Emilio Baiada; Paolo Budinich; Lamberto Cesari; Guido Stampacchia

Leonida Tonelli (19 April 1885 – 12 March 1946) was an Italian mathematician, noted for proving Tonelli's theorem, a variation of Fubini's theorem, and for introducing semicontinuity methods as a common tool for the direct method in the calculus of variations.

== Education ==
Tonelli graduated from the University of Bologna in 1907; his Ph.D. thesis was written under the direction of Cesare Arzelà.

== Work ==
He is one of the founders of Modern Theory of Functions of Real Variables and his work on the Calculus of Variations is a milestone in analysis.

— Olga Arsenievna Oleinik, (Oleinik 1986, p. 28)

The present writer's father, W. H. Young, used to recall that this very question — what principle can we use as the foundation of the calculus of variations — had been put him by a young Italian mathematician. His reply was a question: "Can you use semicontinuity?" The young Italian was Leonida Tonelli. Semicontinuity was then still a recent concept, known only to a few. In the hands of Tonelli, it became an important tool in a fundamental new approach to the calculus of variations.

— Laurence Chisholm Young, (Young 1969, p. 153)

== Selected publications ==
- Opere scelte, a cura dell'Unione matematica italiana e col contributo del Consiglio nazionale delle ricerche, 1900
- Fondamenti di Calcolo delle Variazioni. Zanichelli, Bologna, vol. 1: 1922, vol. 2: 1923
- Tonelli, Leonida (1925). "The Calculus of Variations". Bulletin of the American Mathematical Society. 31 (3–4): 163–172. doi:10.1090/s0002-9904-1925-04002-1. MR 1561014.
- Serie trigonometriche. Zanichelli, Bologna 1928

== See also ==
- Calculus of variations
- Fourier series
- Lebesgue integral
- Mathematical analysis
