= Michele Tenore =

Italian botanist

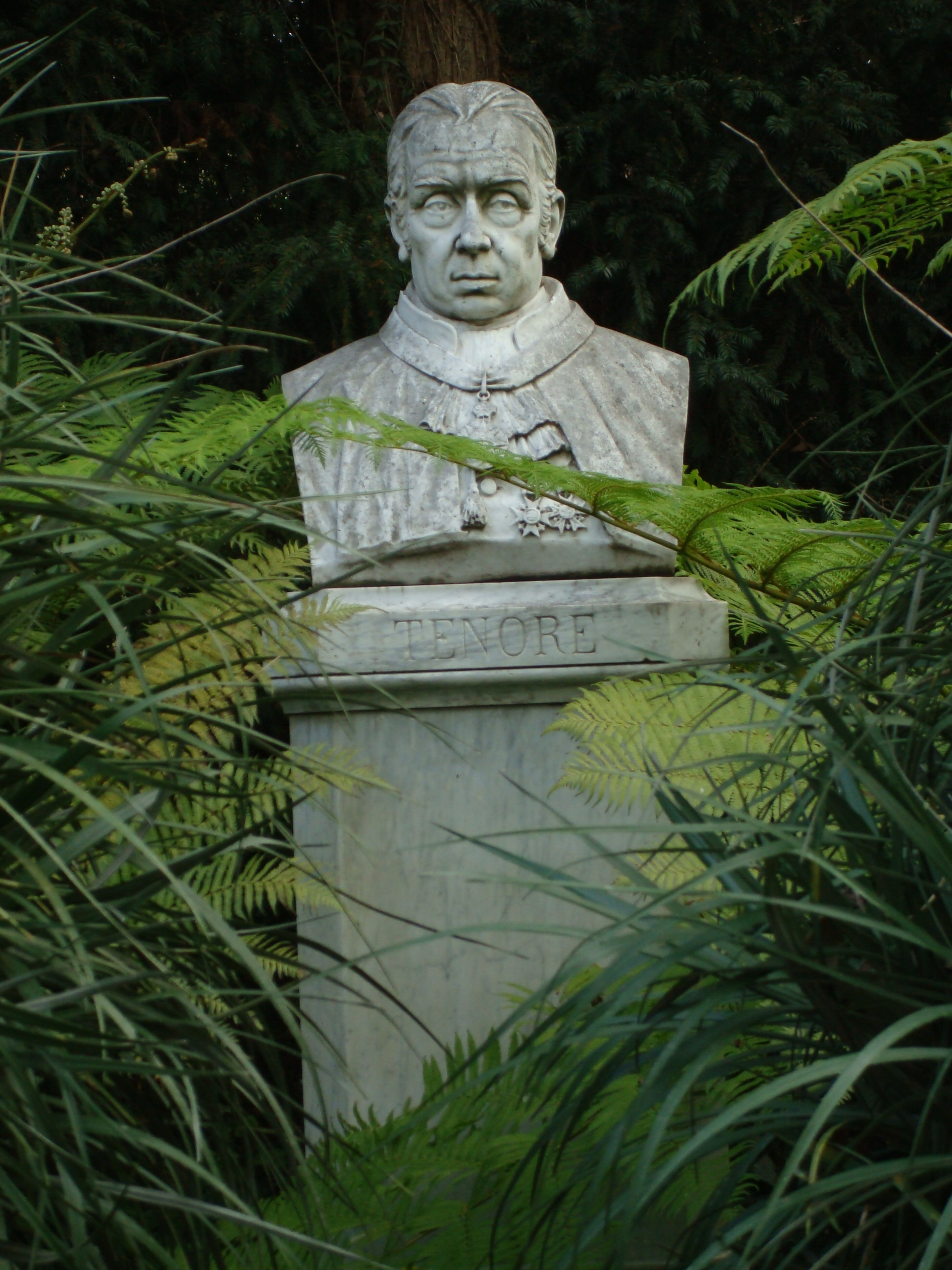
Bust of Michele Tenore

Michele Tenore (5 May 1780 – 19 July 1861) was an Italian botanist active in Naples, Italy.

Tenore studied at the University of Naples, receiving his medical degree in 1800. Tenore was a friend of botanists Domenico Maria Leone Cirillo (1739–1799) and Vincenzo Petagna (1734–1810). Tenore made numerous botanical excursions into Abruzzo and particularly Majella, and gave private courses in botany. In 1811, he succeeded Petagna to the university's chair in botany.

Tenore helped establish the Botanical Garden of Naples, and became its director in 1810. He also served as president of the Accademia nazionale delle scienze, and served as president of the Accademia Pontaniana six times from the 1830s through the 1850s.

In 1853, Tenore founded the Tenore prize, a prize still awarded from the Accademia Pontaniana.

== Selected works ==
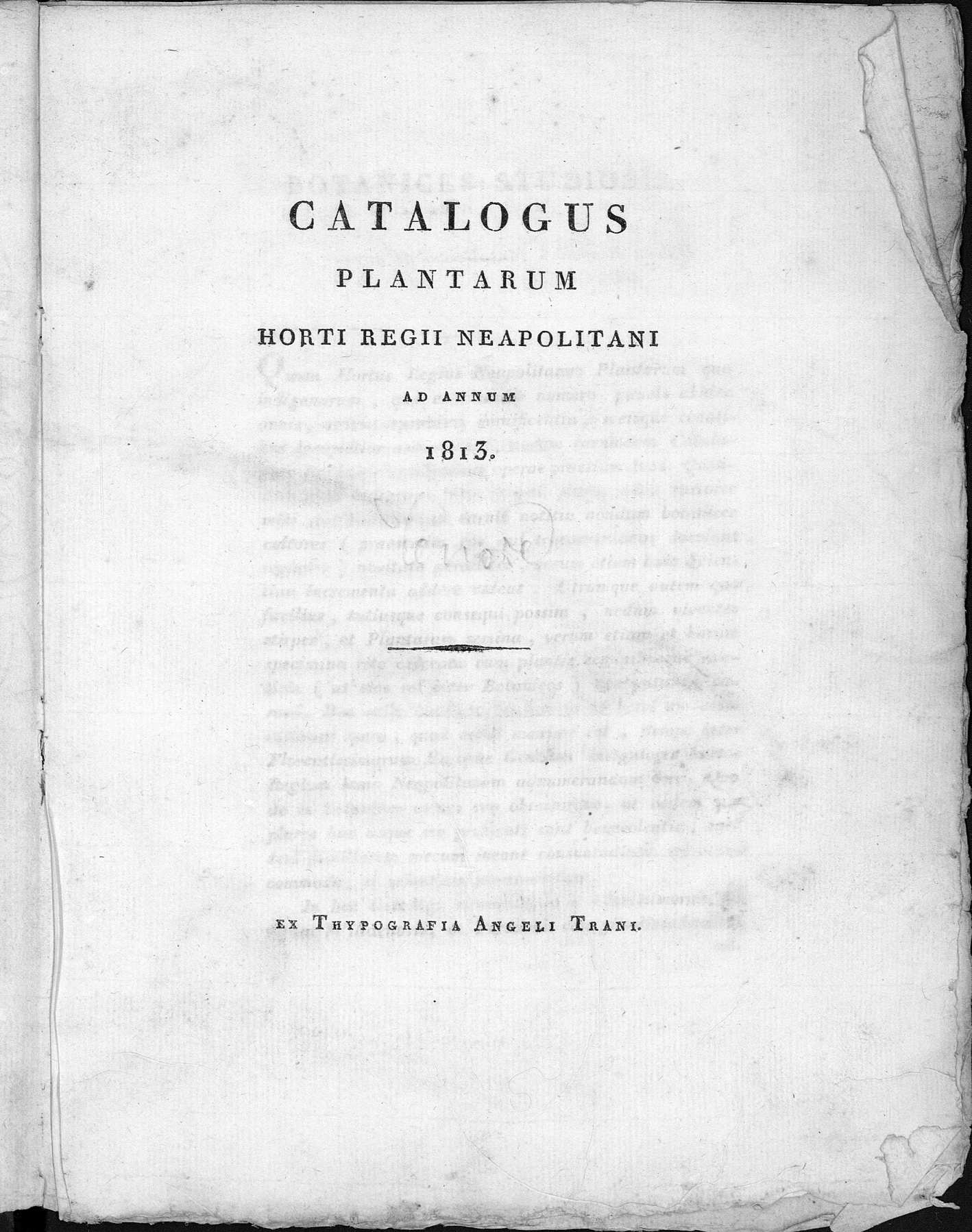
Catalogus plantarum Horti regii Neapolitani ad annum 1813, 1813

- Catalogus plantarum Horti regii Neapolitani ad annum 1813 (in Latin). Napoli: Angelo Trani. 1813.
- TENORE M., 1811-38 - Flora Napolitana. Napoli. 1-5. Stamperia Reale, Napoli. Tipografia del Giornale Enciclopedico, Napoli. Stamperia Francese, Napoli. Stamperia Francese, Napoli.
- TENORE M., 1832 - Memoria sulle peregrinazioni botaniche effettuate nella provincia di Napoli nella primavera del 1825 dal Cavaliere Michele Tenore colle indicazioni di alcune piante da aggiungersi alla Flora Napolitana e la descrizione di una specie di Ononis. Atti R. Accad. Scienze Cl. Fis. e St. Nat., 3: 49-88.
- TENORE M., 1843 - Rapporto intorno alle peregrinazioni de' soci ordinari M. Tenore e G. Gussone eseguite in Luglio 1834. Atti R. Accad. Scienze 5(1): 283-290. Napoli 1843 (in collab. con G. Gussone).
- TENORE M., 1843 - Osservazioni botaniche raccolte in un viaggio eseguito per diversi luoghi della provincia di Terra di Lavoro e di Abruzzo nell'està del 1834 dai soci Tenore e Gussone. Ibid.: 291-334, 1 tav. Napoli 1843 (In collab. con G. Gussone).
- TENORE M., 1846 - Osservazioni intorno all'Erbario Centrale di Firenze (23 settembre 1845). p. 852. Napoli 1846.
- TENORE M., 1856 - Una gita all'Isola d'Ischia. Lettera al Sig. N. N. Giornale "L'Iride" 1, n. 20 (estr. pp. 6) Napoli, Tip. Gazzette de' Tribunali ( 14x21.5).
