= Rosanna Sornicola =

Italian linguist (born 1953)

- Born: February 1953 (age 73); Italy
- Education: University of Naples
- Scientific career
- Fields: Linguistics

Rosanna Sornicola (born February 1953) is an Italian linguist specializing in typology, Latin and Romance linguistics.

== Career and honours ==
Sornicola studied at the University of Naples, then held positions as assistant professor at the University of Salerno (1977-1978), lecturer at the University of Palermo (1978-1983) and associate professor at the University of Basilicata (1983-1988), all in general linguistics. In 1988 she returned to the University of Naples as associate professor of sociolinguistics. Between 1990 and 1993 she worked as full professor of sociolinguistics at the University of Calabria, before returning to Naples as full professor of general linguistics, where she was to spend the rest of her career.

Sornicola has held visiting positions at UCLA (1990) and Wolfson College, Cambridge (1983), of which she has been a senior member since 2001. Between 1999 and 2003 she served as president of the Italian Society of Linguistics. Since 2011 she has been a member of the National Society of Sciences, Letters and Arts of Naples, and since 2013 a member of the Accademia Pontaniana. In 2017 she was elected Member of the Academia Europaea.

== Research ==
Sornicola has published broadly across syntax, functional linguistics, historical linguistics, the languages of Italy, the history of linguistics, second-language acquisition, sociolinguistics, and the language of Roman law.

== Selected publications ==
- Sornicola, Rosanna. 1981. Sul parlato (On speech). Bologna: Il Mulino.
- Vàrvaro, Alberto, and Rosanna Sornicola. 1986. Vocabolario etimologico siciliano, vol. 1. Centro di Studi Filologici e Linguistici Siciliani.
- Sornicola, Rosanna. 1988. It-clefts and wh-clefts: two awkward sentence types. Journal of Linguistics 24 (2), 343–379. doi:10.1017/S0022226700011828
- Sornicola, Rosanna. 1993. Topic, Focus and word-order. In R. E. Asher and J. M. Y. Simpson (eds.), The encyclopedia of language and linguistics, vol. 9: Syntax, 4633b-4640b. Oxford/New York: Pergamon Press.
- Sornicola, Rosanna. 2006. Campania. In Martin Maiden and Mair Parry (eds.), The dialects of Italy, 330–337. London: Routledge.
