= Alessandro Faedo =

Italian mathematician and politician (1913–2001)

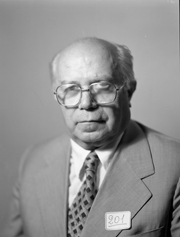
- Born: 18 November 1913; Chiampo, Vicenza
- Died: 16 June 2001 (aged 87); Pisa
- Education: Università di Pisa
- Known for: Faedo–Galerkin method
- Scientific career
- Fields: Numerical analysis; Mathematical analysis
- Workplaces: Università di Pisa
- Doctoral advisor: Leonida Tonelli

Alessandro Faedo (18 November 1913 – 16 June 2001) (also known as Alessandro Carlo Faedo or Sandro Faedo) was an Italian mathematician and politician, born in Chiampo. He is known for his work in numerical analysis, leading to the Faedo–Galerkin method: he was one of the pupils of Leonida Tonelli and, after his death, he succeeded him on the chair of mathematical analysis at the University of Pisa, becoming dean of the faculty of sciences and then rector and exerting a strong positive influence on the development of the university.

== Selected publications ==
=== Scientific works ===
- Faedo, Sandro (1949), "Un nuovo metodo per l'analisi esistenziale e quantitativa dei problemi di propagazione" [A new method for the existential and quantitative analysis of propagation problems], Annali della Scuola Normale Superiore di Pisa. Classe di Scienze, Serie 3 (in Italian), 1 (1–4): 1–41, MR 0032904, Zbl 0033.27502.
- Faedo, Sandro (1957), "Su un principio di esistenza nell'analisi lineare" [On an existence principle in linear analysis], Annali della Scuola Normale Superiore di Pisa. Classe di Scienze, Serie 3 (in Italian), 11 (1–2): 1–8, MR 0096957, Zbl 0087.32304.
- Faedo, Sandro (1958), "Applicazione ai problemi di derivata obliqua di un principio esistenziale e di una legge di dualità fra le formule di maggiorazione" [Application to oblique derivative problems of an existence principle and a duality law between estimates], Rendiconti di Matematica e delle sue Applicazioni, V Serie (in Italian), 16: 515–532, doi:10.1007/978-3-642-10918-8_4, MR 0096959, Zbl 0105.29902, reprinted also in the book: Fichera, G.; Magenes, E., eds. (2011), Integrali singolari e questioni connesse [Singular integrals and related questions], Lecture Notes in Mathematics, C.I.M.E. Summer Schools (CIME, volume 13) (in Italian), pp. 109–123, doi:10.1007/978-3-642-10918-8_4, ISBN 978-3-642-10916-4.
- Faedo, Sandro (1978), "Sul teorema di Cauchy degli incrementi finiti" [On Cauchy's theorem about finite increments], Rendiconti di Matematica, VI Serie (in Italian), 10 (1977): 489–499, MR 0480904, Zbl 0384.26002.

=== Historical, commemorative and survey works ===
- Faedo, Alessandro (1966–1967), "Calcolatori elettronici e ricerca scientifica" [Electronic computers and scientific research] (PDF), L'Odeo Olimpico (in Italian), numero VI: 185–198. A survey on the early uses and on the development of electronic computers in Italy.
- Faedo, Sandro (1986), "Leonida Tonelli e la scuola matematica pisana" [Leonida Tonelli and the Pisa mathematical school], in Montalenti, G.; Amerio, L.; Acquaro, G.; Baiada, E.; et al. (eds.), Convegno celebrativo del centenario della nascita di Mauro Picone e Leonida Tonelli (6–9 maggio 1985) [International congress in occasion of the celebration of the centenary of birth of Mauro Picone and Leonida Tonelli], Atti dei Convegni Lincei (in Italian), vol. 77, Roma: Accademia Nazionale dei Lincei, pp. 89–109, archived from the original on 2011-02-23. A survey of the work of Tonelli in Pisa and his influence on the development of the school, presented in Rome on 6–9 May 1985, also published as Faedo, Alessandro (1998), "Leonida Tonelli e la scuola matematica pisana" [Leonida Tonelli and the Pisa mathematical school], in Bassani, Franco (ed.), Leonida Tonelli e la matematica nella cultura Italiana del '900 [Leonida Tonelli and mathematics in the Italian culture of '900], Quaderni della Direzione della Scuola Normale Superiore di Pisa (in Italian), vol. 2, Pisa: Nistri-Lischi, pp. 21–41, ISBN 978-8-883-81269-9.
- Faedo, Alessandro (1987–1990), "Mariano Rumor nel ricordo di Alessandro Faedo" [Mariano Rumor as remembered by Alessandro Faedo] (PDF), L'Odeo Olimpico (in Italian), numero XX: 291.
- Faedo, Sandro (1993), "Ricordo di Aldo Ghizzetti" [Remembrance of Aldo Ghizzetti], Calcolo (in Italian), 30 (1): I–XXVI, doi:10.1007/BF02575881, MR 1273400.
- Faedo, Sandro (1997), "Come Ennio De Giorgi giunse alla Scuola Normale Superiore" [How Ennio De Giorgi came to the Scuola Normale Superiore], Annali della Scuola Normale Superiore di Pisa. Classe di Scienze, Serie 4 (in Italian), 11 (3–4): 433–434, MR 1655526, Zbl 1001.01502.

== See also ==
- Calculus of variation
- Fichera's existence principle
- Variational method
- Ritz method
