= Pablo Tonelli =

Argentine politician

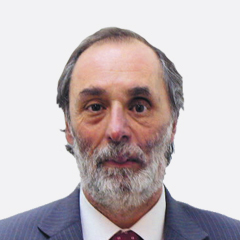

Councillor of Magistracy
- Incumbent
- Assumed office 12 November 2015
- Appointed by: Chamber of Deputies

National Deputy
- Incumbent
- Assumed office 10 December 2011
- Constituency: City of Buenos Aires
- In office 10 December 2005 – 10 December 2007
- Constituency: Buenos Aires

Personal details
- Born: 13 April 1954 (age 72) La Plata, Argentina
- Party: Republican Proposal
- Other political affiliations: Juntos por el Cambio (2015–present)
- Education: National University of La Plata

Pablo Gabriel Tonelli (born 13 June 1954) is an Argentine lawyer and politician, currently serving as National Deputy elected in the Federal Capital. A member of Republican Proposal, Tonelli was first elected in 2011, and has been re-elected in 2015 and 2019. Tonelli has also been one of the Chamber's representatives in the Council of Magistracy since 2016.

Tonelli was previously a National Deputy for Buenos Aires Province from 2005 to 2007.

== Early life and career ==
Tonelli was born on 13 June 1954 in La Plata. His father was Ideler Tonelli, a politician for the Radical Civic Union who was Minister of Labour during the presidency of Raúl Alfonsín. He graduated with a law degree from the National University of La Plata in 1977. He is married and has three children.

== Political career ==
Tonelli served as an advisor to the presidency of the Buenos Aires Province Senate from 1984 to 1987, and then served as Undersecretary of Justice of Argentina during the presidency of Raúl Alfonsín in 1989. In 1993, he was appointed Minister of Government of Corrientes Province during the federal intervention of his father.

Tonelli ran for a seat in the Argentine Chamber of Deputies in the 2005 legislative election; he was the first candidate in the Republican Proposal list in Buenos Aires Province. The list received 6.99% of the votes, and Tonelli was elected. He resigned his seat two years later, in 2007, and was replaced by Marcelo Amenta. That year, he was appointed Prosecutor General of Buenos Aires.

He successfully ran for the Chamber of Deputies again in 2011, this time for the City of Buenos Aires. He was re-elected in 2019.

On 16 December 2016, he was sworn in as one of the Chamber of Deputies' representatives in the Council of Magistracy of the Nation. His appointment caused controversy, as the Front for Victory argued his spot corresponded to a deputy from the Opposition.

In 2019, Tonelli became implicated in the Correo Argentino embezzlement case.
