= Ideler Tonelli =

Argentine lawyer and politician

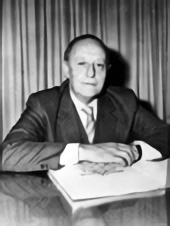
Ideler Santiago Tonelli (1924–2016), Argentine lawyer and politician

Ideler Santiago Tonelli (18 December 1924 – 10 August 2016) was an Argentine lawyer and politician. He served as Minister of Labor from 1987 to 1989, during the presidency of Raúl Alfonsín.

Born on 18 December 1924 in Bragado, Buenos Aires, he became a lawyer after passing the civil service exam. He served as a national deputy between 1958 and 1962. During Alfonsin's presidency, Tonelli wasn't merely the labor minister, but the justice minister as well. In that position, he wrote the Law of Due Obedience, which placed the responsibility for the crimes of the dictatorship on military commanders. Tonelli held another important federal post as federal inspector of the province of Corrientes between February and December 1993. He died on 10 August 2016. His son, Pablo Tonelli, is a national deputy.
