= William Henry Young =

English mathematician (1863–1942)

William Henry Young FRS
- Portrait by Walter Stoneman, 1920
- Born: 20 October 1863; London, England
- Died: 7 July 1942 (aged 78); Lausanne, Switzerland
- Known for: Young's inequality for products Young's convolution inequality Hausdorff–Young inequality Young's Theorem
- Spouse: Grace Chisholm Young (m. 1896)
- Children: 6, including Laurence Chisholm Young and Rosalind Tanner
- Relatives: Hugh Chisholm (brother-in-law); Archibald Chisholm (nephew)
- Scientific career
- Fields: Mathematics
- Workplaces: Calcutta University

William Henry Young (20 October 1863 – 7 July 1942) was an English mathematician. Young was educated at City of London School and Peterhouse, Cambridge. He worked on measure theory, Fourier series, differential calculus, amongst other fields, and made contributions to the study of functions of several complex variables. He was the husband of Grace Chisholm Young, with whom he authored and co-authored 214 papers and 4 books. Two of their children became professional mathematicians (Laurence Chisholm Young, Cecilia Rosalind Tanner). Young's Theorem was named after him.

In 1913 he was the first to be appointed to the newly created chair of the Hardinge Professorship of Pure Mathematics in Calcutta University which he held from 1913 to 1917. He also held the part-time Professorship of Philosophy and the History of Mathematics at the University of Liverpool from 1913 to 1919.

He was elected a Fellow of the Royal Society on 2 May 1907. He served as the president of the London Mathematical Society from 1922 to 1924. In 1917 he was awarded the De Morgan Medal of London Mathematical Society and in 1928 the Sylvester Medal of the Royal Society.

He served as the president of the International Mathematical Union from 1929 to 1936.

== Works ==
- 1905: (with Grace Chisholm Young) The First Book of Geometry, J. M. Dent
- 1906: (with Grace Chisholm Young) The Theory of Sets of Points via Internet Archive
- 1910: Fundamental Theorems of the Differential Calculus via Internet Archive
- Chatterji, Srishti Dhar; Wefelscheid, Heinrich, eds. (2000), Selected papers of Grace Chisholm Young and William Henry Young, Enseignement des mathématiques, Lausanne: Presses Polytechniques et Universitaires Romandes, pp. ix+870, ISBN 978-2-88074-445-8, MR 1781670, Zbl 0947.01020.
