= Laurence Chisholm Young =

British mathematician (1905–2000)

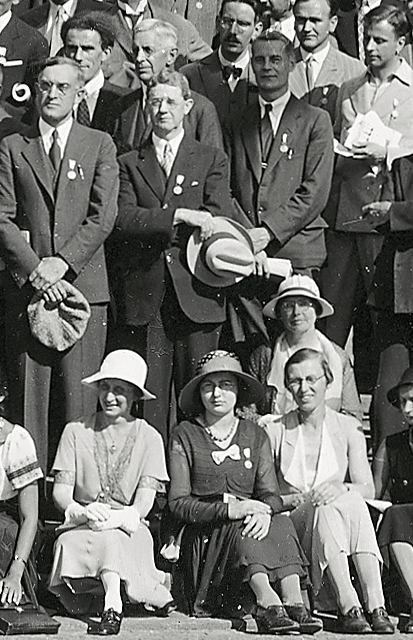
- L. Ch. Young (standing right) at the ICM 1932
- Born: 14 July 1905; Göttingen, German Empire
- Died: 24 December 2000 (aged 95); Madison, Wisconsin, U.S.
- Education: Cambridge University
- Known for: Calculus of variations, real analysis
- Spouse: Joan Elizabeth Young
- Parents: William Henry Young (father); Grace Chisholm Young (mother)
- Relatives: Rosalind Tanner (sister); Hugh Chisholm (uncle); Archibald Chisholm (cousin)
- Awards: Isaac Newton Studentship (1930); Honorary degree from Paris Dauphine University (1984)
- Scientific career
- Fields: Mathematics
- Workplaces: Trinity College, Cambridge; University of Cape Town; University of Wisconsin–Madison; University of Campinas; IMPA
- Doctoral students: Wendell Fleming

Laurence Chisholm Young (/ˈtʃɪzəm/ CHIZ-əm; 14 July 1905 – 24 December 2000) was a British mathematician known for his contributions to measure theory, the calculus of variations, optimal control theory, and potential theory. He was the son of William Henry Young and Grace Chisholm Young, both prominent mathematicians. He moved to the US in 1949 but never sought American citizenship.

The concept of Young measure is named after him: he also introduced the concept of the generalized curve and the concept of generalized surface which later evolved into the concept of varifold. The Young integral is also named after him and has now been generalised in the theory of rough paths.

== Life and academic career ==
Laurence Chisholm Young was born in Göttingen, the fifth of the six children of William Henry Young and Grace Chisholm Young. He held positions as a professor at the University of Cape Town, South Africa, and at the University of Wisconsin-Madison. He was also a Chess Grandmaster.

Young married Joan Elizabeth Birks in 1934, and remained together until her death in 1995.

== Selected publications ==
=== Books ===
- Young, L. C. (1927), The Theory of Integration, Cambridge Tracts in Mathematics and Mathematical Physics, vol. 21, Cambridge: Cambridge University Press, pp. viii + 53, JFM 53.0207.19, available from the Internet archive.
- Young, L. C. (1969), Lectures on the Calculus of Variations and Optimal Control, Philadelphia–London–Toronto: W. B. Saunders, pp. xi+331, ISBN 9780721696409, MR 0259704, Zbl 0177.37801.
- Young, Laurence (1981), Mathematicians and their times. History of mathematics and mathematics of history, North-Holland Mathematics Studies, 48 / Notas de Matemática [Mathematical Notes], 76, Amsterdam–New York: North-Holland Publishing Co., pp. x+344, ISBN 978-0-444-86135-1, MR 0629980, Zbl 0446.01028.

=== Papers ===
- Young, L. C. (1936), "An inequality of the Hölder type, connected with Stieltjes integration", Acta Mathematica, 67 (1): 251–282, doi:10.1007/bf02401743, JFM 62.0250.02, Zbl 0016.10404.
- Young, L. C. (1937), "Generalized curves and the existence of an attained absolute minimum in the Calculus of Variations", Comptes Rendus des Séances de la Société des Sciences et des Lettres de Varsovie, Classe III, XXX (7–9): 211–234, JFM 63.1064.01, Zbl 0019.21901, memoir presented by Stanisław Saks at the session of 16 December 1937 of the Warsaw Society of Sciences and Letters. The free PDF copy is made available by the RCIN –Digital Repository of the Scientifics Institutes.
- Young, L. C. (January 1942), "Generalized Surfaces in the Calculus of Variations", Annals of Mathematics, Second Series, 43 (1): 84–103, doi:10.2307/1968882, JFM 68.0227.03, JSTOR 1968882, MR 0006023, Zbl 0063.09081.
- Young, L. C. (July 1942a), "Generalized Surfaces in the Calculus of Variations. II", Annals of Mathematics, Second Series, 43 (3): 530–544, doi:10.2307/1968809, JSTOR 1968809, MR 0006832, Zbl 0063.08362.
- Young, L. C. (1951), "Surfaces parametriques generalisees", Bulletin de la Société Mathématique de France, 79: 59–84, doi:10.24033/bsmf.1419, MR 0046421, Zbl 0044.10203.
- Young, L. C. (1954), "A variational algorithm" (PDF), Rivista di Matematica della Università di Parma, (1), 5: 255–268, MR 0081437, Zbl 0059.09605.
- Young, L. C. (1959), "Partial area – I" (PDF), Rivista di Matematica della Università di Parma, (1), 10: 103–113, MR 0141760, Zbl 0107.27402.
- Young, L. C. (1959a), "Partial area. Part. II: Contours on hypersurfaces" (PDF), Rivista di Matematica della Università di Parma, (1), 10: 171–182, MR 0141761, Zbl 0107.27402.
- Young, L. C. (1959b), "Partial area. Part III: Symmetrization and the isoperimetric and least area problems" (PDF), Rivista di Matematica della Università di Parma, (1), 10: 257–263, MR 0141762, Zbl 0107.27402.
- Young, Laurence C. (1989), "Remarks and personal reminiscences", in Roxin, Emilio O. (ed.), Modern optimal control: a conference in honor of Solomon Lefschetz and Joseph P. LaSalle, Lecture Notes in Pure and Applied Mathematics, vol. 119, New York: Marcel Dekker, pp. 421–433, ISBN 9780824781682, MR 1013226.

== See also ==
- Bounded variation
- Caccioppoli set
- Measure theory
- Varifold
