= List of piers in San Francisco =

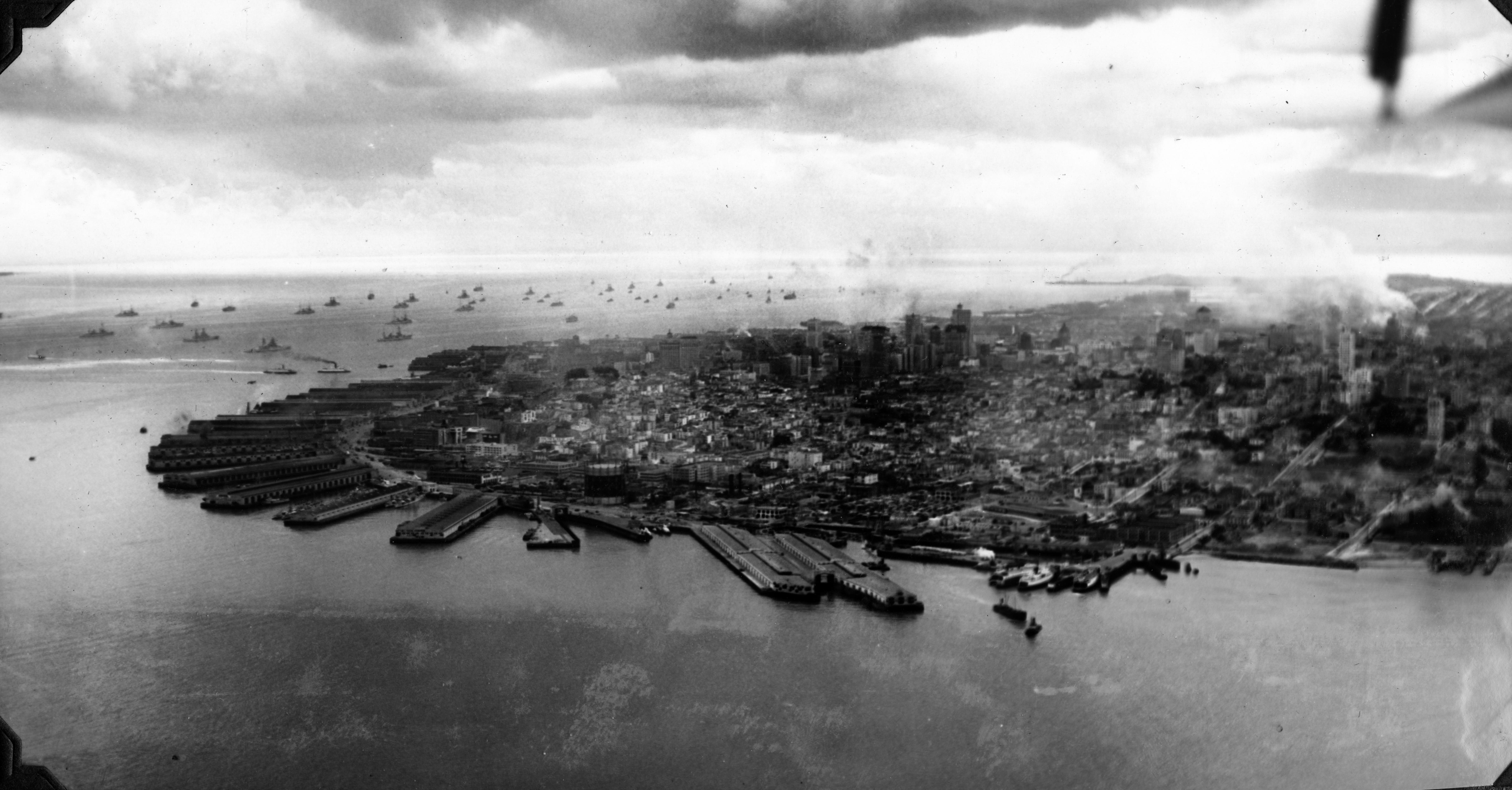
Aerial view of San Francisco pre-1936

The piers in San Francisco are part of the Port of San Francisco and run along the Embarcadero, following the curve along the eastern waterfront and roadway of the Port of San Francisco. The Ferry Building is considered the center with the odd-numbered piers going north of the building at Market Street, and the even-numbered piers going south.

== Piers ==
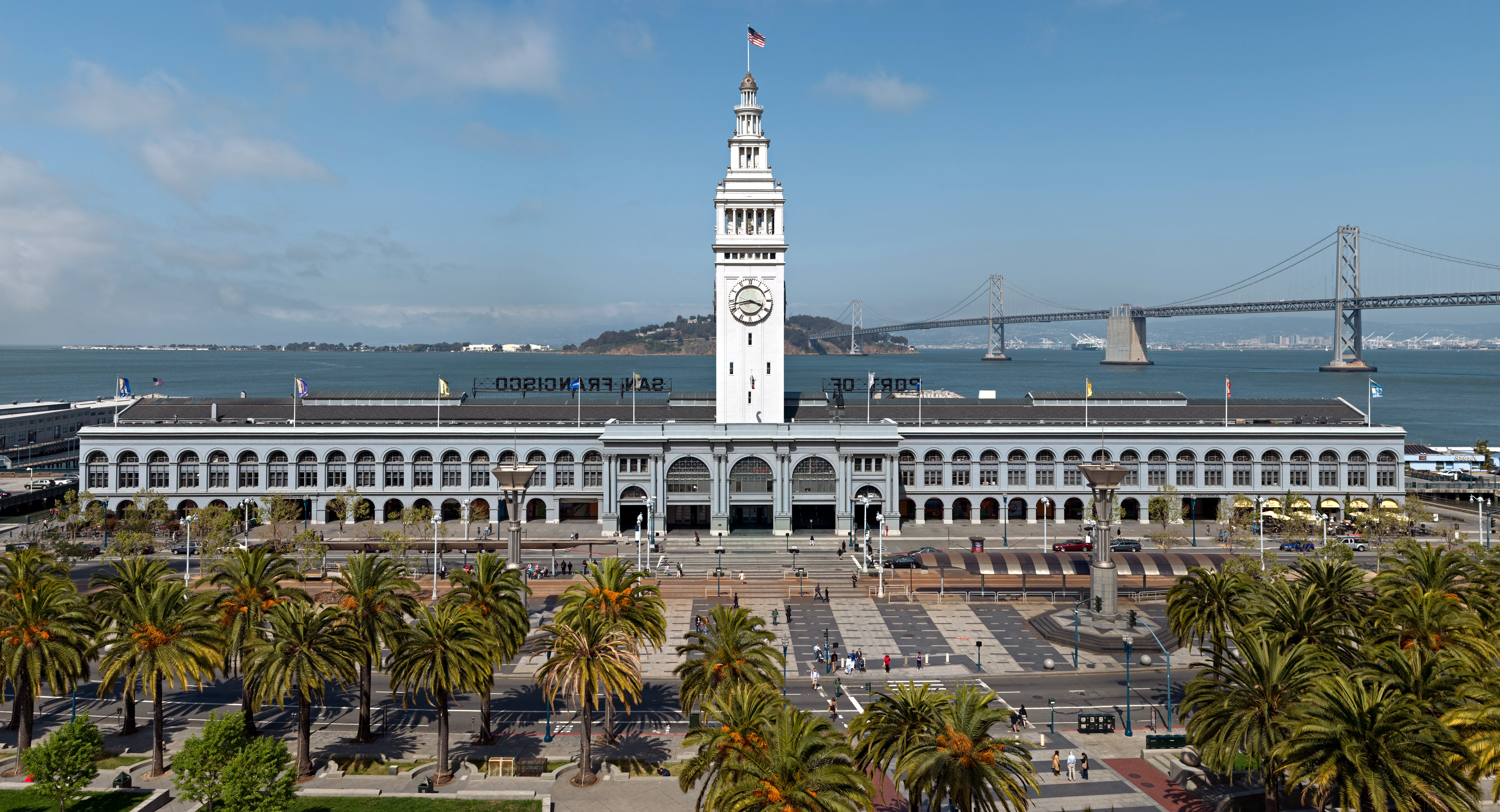
The Ferry Building, along the Embarcadero. Treasure Island, Yerba Buena Island, and the Bay Bridge can be seen in the background, with Justin Herman Plaza and the foot of Market Street in the foreground.

=== Odd ===
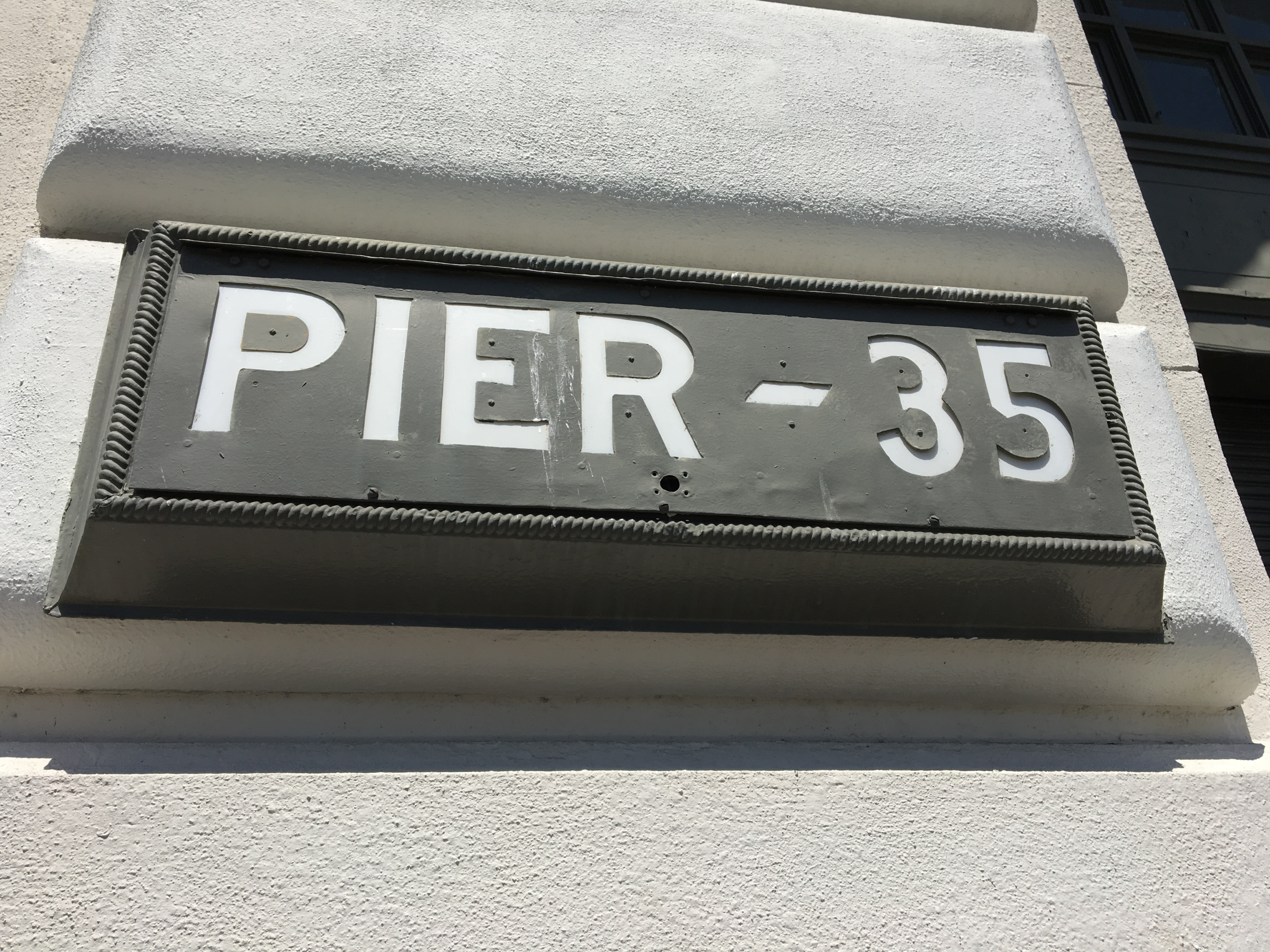
Sign for Pier 35

- Ferry Building and Pier 1
- Pier 1 1/2 - Water taxi service
- Pier 3 - Offices of Hornblower Cruises
- Pier 5 - Central Embarcadero Piers Historic District
- Pier 7 - Pier 7 Photos on the Commons
- Pier 9 - Pier 9 Photos on the Commons
- Pier 11 - Pier 11 Photos on the Commons
- Pier 13 - Pier 13 Photos on the Commons
- Piers 15 and 17 - Exploratorium
- Pier 19 - Pier 19 Photos on the Commons
- Pier 23 - Pier 23 Photos on the Commons
- Piers 27 and 29 - America's Cup Park
- Pier 31 - Pier 31 Photos on the Commons
- Pier 33 - Alcatraz Ferry
- Pier 35 - Princess Cruises
- Pier 39 - Home to sea lions
- Pier 41 - A ferry terminal on Fisherman's Wharf, home to the Blue & Gold Fleet
- Pier 43 - Pier 43 Photos on the Commons
- Pier 43 1/2 - Home to the Red & White Fleet
- Pier 45 - Home to museum ships

Past the numbered piers, there are other well-known piers past Pier 45 at the western end of Fisherman's Wharf.

- Hyde Street Pier
- Municipal Pier

=== Even ===
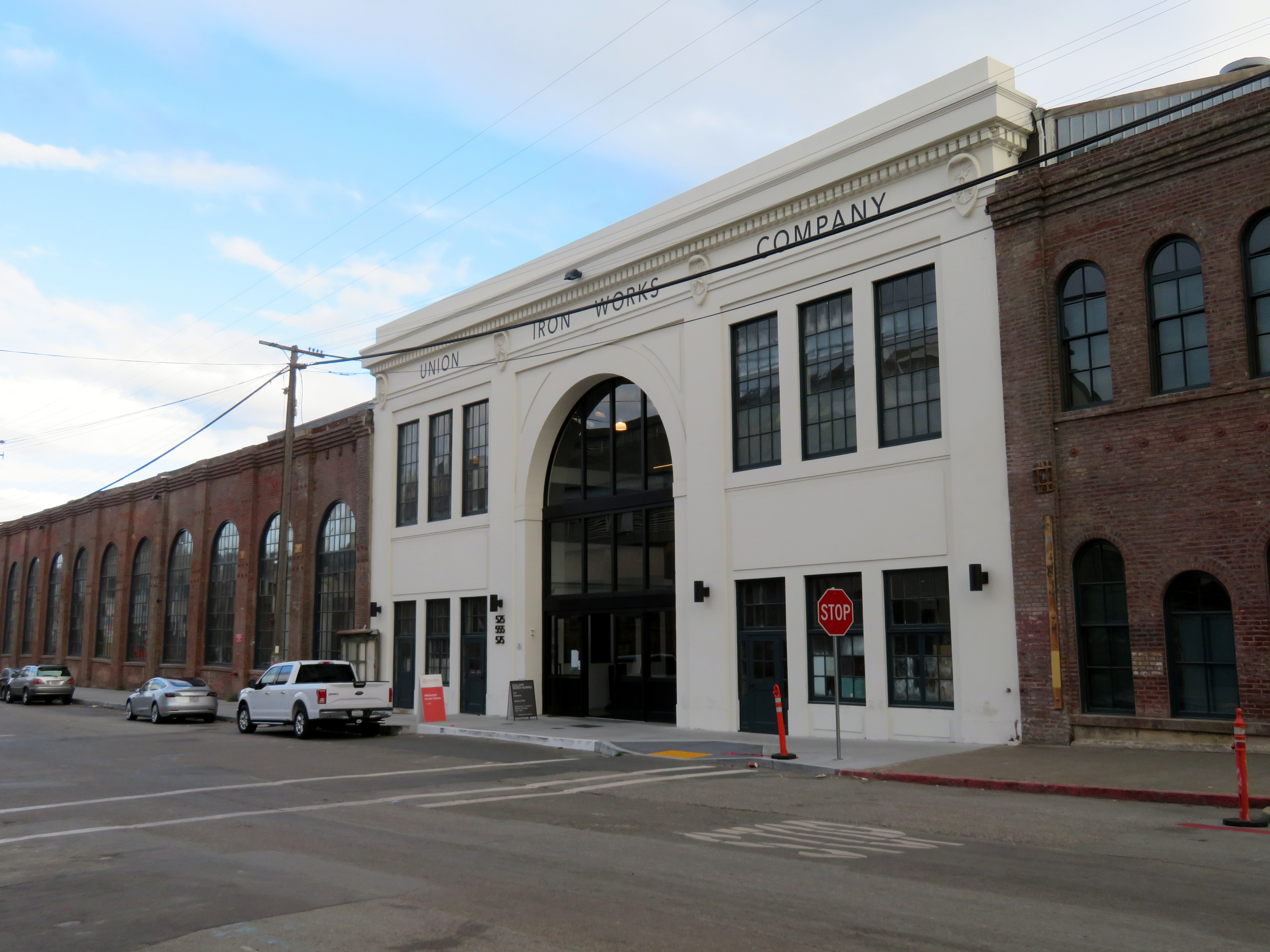
Pier 70 - home to the Union Iron Works

- Pier 14 - Pier 14 Photos on the Commons
- Pier 16 - Pier 16 Photos on the Commons
- Pier 18 - Pier 18 Photos on the Commons
- Pier 20 - Pier 20 Photos on the Commons
- Pier 22 1/2 - Pier 22 1/2 Photos on the Commons
- Pier 24 - Home to Pier 24 Photography
- Pier 26 - Shelton Studios
- Pier 28 - Pier 28 Photos on the Commons
- Piers 30 and 32 - Piers 30 and 32 Photos on the Commons
- Pier 34 - Pier 34 Photos on the Commons
- Pier 36 - Pier 36 Photos on the Commons
- Pier 38 - Pier 38 Photos on the Commons
- Pier 40 - Pier 40 Photos on the Commons
- Pier 42 - Pier 42 Photos on the Commons
- Pier 48 - Next to McCovey Cove
- Pier 50 - Layberth pier for the MV Cape Hudson and the MV Cape Horn (RORO ships)
- Pier 52 - Pier 52 Photos on the Commons
- Pier 70 - home to the Union Iron Works
- Pier 80 - Layberth pier for the MV Cape Sable and the MV Cape San Juan (RORO ships), former layberth pier for the SS Algol and the SS Capella (SL-7s), site of the annual Portola Music Festival, Pier 80 Photos on the Commons
- Pier 90 - Pier 90 Photos on the Commons
- Pier 92 - Pier 92 Photos on the Commons
- Pier 94 - Layberth pier for the MV Cape Starr (RORO ship)
- Pier 96 - Recology Recycling plant, layberth pier for the MV Cape Henry (RORO ship)

== See also ==
- Ferries of San Francisco Bay
- List of piers
- Transportation in the San Francisco Bay Area
