= Wolbert =

Wolbert or Wölbert is a German surname and a given name. Notable people with the surname include:

- Agnes Wolbert (1958–2025), Dutch politician
- Ann C. Wolbert Burgess or Ann Burgess, American university teacher
- Anka Wolbert
- Dorothea Wolbert (1874–1958), American actress
- Kevin Wölbert, German motorcycle speedway rider
- William Wolbert (1883–1918), American actor and screenwriter
- Wolbert Klaus Smidt

== See also ==
- Walbert
- Walberto
- Wolpert
- Wolber
