= Tote =

Tote may refer to:

== Places ==
- Tote, Skye, a crofting township on the Isle of Skye

== Container ==
- Tote bag, a carry bag that is often used to carry items too large for a purse or handbag; sometimes also sold as a reusable shopping bag
- IBC tote or intermediate bulk container tote

== Organisations ==
- The Tote, British bookmakers
- Tote Ireland, a subsidiary of Horse Racing Ireland
- Totes Isotoner or Totes, an international umbrella, footwear, and cold weather accessory supplier
- TOTE Maritime, American shipping company
- Tote Tasmania, Tasmanian totalisator and bookmakers

== Other uses ==
- Tote board, a large numeric or alphanumeric display used to convey information
- Tote (Transformers), a fictional character
- The Tote Hotel, a hotel, pub, bar and music venue in Melbourne, Australia
- Action regulation theory (T. O. T. E. Test - Operate - Test - Exit), an iterative problem solving strategy in psychology
- Totem of the Eagle (TOTE), symbol of the Improved Order of Red Men
- Tote (footballer) (Jorge López Marco, born 1978), Spanish footballer
- Parimutuel betting is sometimes known as a Tote

== See also ==
- Total
- "Ol' Man River"
