= Volpert =

Volpert (or Vol'pert) is a surname. Notable people with the surname include:

- Aizik Isaakovich Vol'pert (1923—2006), a Soviet and Israeli mathematician.
- Amiel R. Volpert (Амиэ́ль Рафаилович Во́льперт) (1908—1988), a Soviet engineer and one of the inventors of the Smith chart.
- Larissa Volpert, Larisa Ilinichna Volpert, a Russian chess Woman Grandmaster.
- Liliane Chapiro-Volpert (1902–1982), known as Lilian Constantini, French actress in the 1920s and 1930s.
- Walter Volpert, German psychologist and one of the founders of the action regulation theory

== See also ==
- Wolpert
