= Volpert graph =

Volpert graph, Vol'pert graph or Wolpert graph may refer to:

- Volpert nomogram, a diagram better known as "Smith chart" coinvented by Russian engineer Amiel Rafailovich Volpert (Амиэ́ль Рафаилович Во́льперт)
- Volpert graph (chemistry), a chemical reaction graph by Russian mathematician Aizik Isaakovich Volpert (Айзик Исаакович Вольперт)
- Volpert graph (psychology), a diagram in action regulation theory by German psychologist Walter Volpert
