= Wolpert =

Wolpert is a surname. Notable people with the surname include:

- Ann Wolpert (1943–2013), American pioneer in digital libraries
- Daniel Wolpert (born 1963), British neuroscientist
- David Wolpert, American mathematician, physicist, and computer scientist
- Gavin Wolpert (born 1984), Canadian-American bridge player
- James Wolpert (born 1990), American singer
- Jay Wolpert (1942–2022), American television producer
- Jenny Wolpert (born mid-1980s), Swedish-American bridge player
- Julian Wolpert (born 1932), American geographer
- Larry Wolpert (born 1956), American politician
- Lewis Wolpert (1929-2021), British developmental biologist
- Ludwig Yehuda Wolpert (1900–1981), Israeli-American goldsmith and designer
- Miranda Wolpert, British psychologist
- Scott A. Wolpert, American mathematician
- Stanley Wolpert (1927–2019), American historian and Indologist

== See also ==
- Hans Wölpert (1898–1957), German weightlifter
- Volpert
- Wolbert
