= SS El Faro =

U.S. flagged Rollon-rolloff container ship

- Promotional photo of El Faro by TOTE Maritime, which operates under Sea Star brand

History
- Name: Puerto Rico (1975–1991); Northern Lights (1991–2006); El Faro (2006–2015)
- Owner: TOTE Maritime
- Operator: Sea Star Line
- Port of registry: San Juan, Puerto Rico, United States
- Route: Jacksonville, Florida, U.S. to San Juan, Puerto Rico, U.S.
- Ordered: 1973
- Builder: Sun Shipbuilding & Drydock Co.
- Yard number: 670
- Laid down: April 11, 1974
- Launched: November 1, 1974
- Completed: January 16, 1975
- Out of service: October 1, 2015
- Identification: Call sign: WFJK; IMO number: 7395351; MMSI number: 368208000
- Fate: Sank with all hands in Hurricane Joaquin on October 1, 2015
- Notes: Location of wreck: 23°22′52″N 73°54′40″W

General characteristics
- Type: Roll-on/roll-off cargo ship
- Tonnage: 31,515 GT; 21,473 NT; 14,971 DWT
- Length: 241 m (791 ft) (after lengthening)
- Beam: 28.6 m (94 ft)
- Draft: 12.8 m (42 ft)
- Propulsion: Single shaft, double reduction compound steam turbine (11,190 kW)
- Speed: 22 knots (41 km/h; 25 mph)
- Crew: 33 personnel (28 Americans and 5 Poles) on final voyage

SS El Faro was a United States-flagged, combination of roll-on/roll-off and lift-on/lift-off cargo ship crewed by U.S. merchant mariners. Built in 1975 by Sun Shipbuilding & Drydock Co. as Puerto Rico, the vessel was renamed Northern Lights in 1991 and, finally, El Faro in 2006. She sank with her entire crew of 33 on October 1, 2015, after steaming into the eyewall of Hurricane Joaquin.

El Faro departed Jacksonville, Florida, under the command of Captain Michael Davidson, bound for San Juan, Puerto Rico, at 8:10 p.m. EST on September 29, 2015, when then-Tropical Storm Joaquin was several hundred miles to the east. Two days later, after Joaquin had become a Category 4 hurricane, the vessel likely encountered swells of 20 to 40 ft (6 to 12 m) and winds over 80 kn (150 km/h; 92 mph) as she sailed near the storm's eye. Around 7:30 a.m. on October 1, the ship had taken on water and was listing 15 degrees. The last report from the captain, however, indicated that the crew had contained the flooding. Shortly after that, El Faro ceased all communications with the shore.

On October 2, the 40-year-old ship was declared missing. An extensive search operation was launched by the United States Coast Guard, with help from the United States Navy, the United States Air Force, and the Air National Guard. During the search, another vessel, Emerald Express, was discovered in the eye of the hurricane. Searchers recovered debris and a damaged lifeboat, and spotted (but could not recover) an unidentifiable body. El Faro was declared sunk on October 5. The search was called off at sunset on October 7, by which time more than 183,000 sq nmi (630,000 km^{2}; 242,000 sq mi) had been covered by aircraft and ships. The Navy sent USNS Apache to conduct an underwater search for El Faro on October 19, 2015. Apache identified a wreckage on October 31 "consistent with the [El Faro] cargo ship ... in an upright position and in one piece". The next day, November 1, the Navy announced a submersible had returned images that identified the wreck as El Faro.

== Construction, modification and earlier career ==
El Faro was built by the Sun Shipbuilding and Drydock Corporation in Chester, Pennsylvania, in 1975 as Puerto Rico. As operated by the Navieras de Puerto Rico Steamship Company, Puerto Rico hauled cargo to and from the East Coast for fifteen years. In 1991, she was purchased by Saltchuk Resources, the parent company of TOTE Maritime, and renamed Northern Lights. Under Saltchuk, she frequently sailed between Tacoma, Washington, and Anchorage, Alaska.

In 1992, the ship underwent a conversion at Atlantic Marine Shipyard in Mobile, Alabama. A 90-foot (27 meters) mid-body, which included an additional cargo hold and a spar deck, was added. Between 2005 and 2006 the ship was modified a second time, also at Atlantic Marine Shipyard, to carry lift-on/lift-off cranes. An additional 4875 long tons (4953.2 metric tons) of fixed ballast was added, and the ship's load line was raised by about two feet so additional cargo could be carried. However, a required damage stability assessment was not performed.

In February 2003, just before the U.S.-led invasion of Iraq, the ship was chartered by the Military Sealift Command as part of Operation Iraqi Freedom; she ferried Marines and military equipment from San Diego, California, to Kuwait. On March 19, while in the Persian Gulf, the vessel came under fire from missiles. The nearby explosions rocked the ship but caused no damage or injuries.

Through October 2005, near the end of the ship's chartered service, she made 25 voyages and 49 port calls. Collectively, 12,200 pieces of military equipment—weighing 81,000 short tons (73,000 t) in all—were transported by the ship. Robert Magee, then president of TOTE, and the ship's crew were praised by United States Air Force general Norton A. Schwartz: "You and your team of professionals showcased the US flag industry at its best." After completing her military services in 2006, the ship was transferred by TOTE to its subsidiary company Sea Star Lines and renamed El Faro. The vessel returned to the original route and served as a "lifeline" between the U.S. mainland and Puerto Rico.

When she sank on October 1, 2015, El Faro was scheduled to return to Tacoma to relieve another vessel.

=== Vessel condition ===
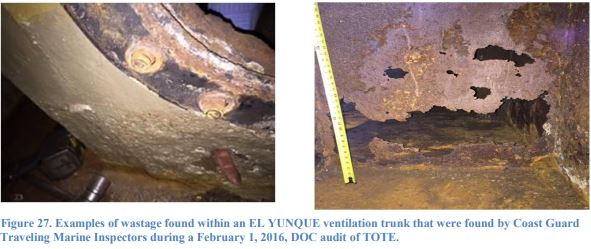
Wastage found of ventilation trunk on SS El Yunque, sister ship of El Faro

El Faro had passed two inspections, one by the United States Coast Guard, in March and June 2014. She completed the American Bureau of Shipping class and statutory surveys in February 2015. The National Transportation Safety Board (NTSB) found that safety drills were conducted weekly and that the ship met stability criteria when she left Jacksonville, Florida, for her fateful voyage.

Former crew members of El Faro expressed surprise and shock that the vessel had set sail with a major storm along its planned track. They said the vessel was "a rust bucket" that was not "supposed to be on the water" and that it suffered drainage problems and leaks in the galley compartment. They reported that the ship's decks were filled with holes as recently as two months before her sinking.

Following the ship's disappearance, the Coast Guard's Marine Safety Center staff examined El Faro's sister ship, El Yunque. The staff found that the condition of El Yunque's cargo ventilation system was poor and likely would have been a source of intermittent flooding during rolling in 25–30 ft seas (7.6 - 9.1 meters).

== Final voyage ==
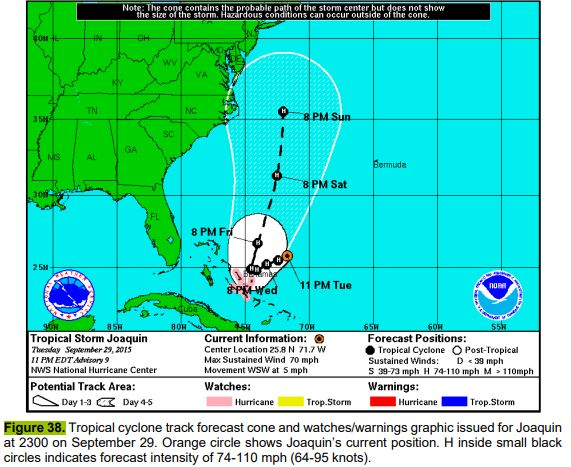
NHC Advisory for Joaquin at 11 p.m., about 3 hours after El Faro's departure

On September 29, 2015, at 8:10 p.m., El Faro left Jacksonville for San Juan, Puerto Rico, carrying a cargo of 391 shipping containers, about 294 trailers and cars, and a crew of 33 people—28 Americans and 5 Poles. The decision to depart Jacksonville by the captain, Michael Davidson, was reasonable given the options available to avoid Hurricane Joaquin; however, he subsequently failed to take sufficient action to avoid the hurricane.

=== Vessel route ===
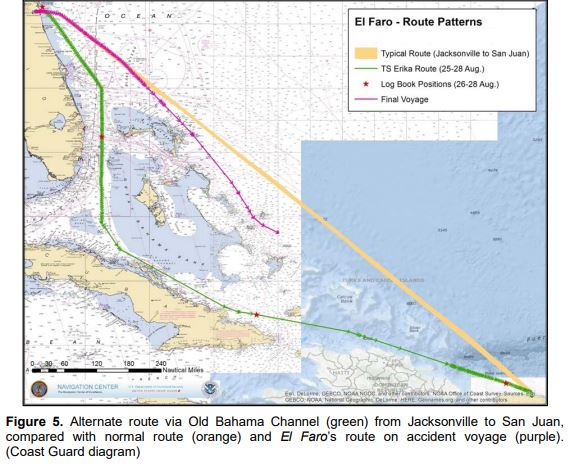
El Faro alternate, normal and accident routes, Jacksonville to San Juan

Upon departure, Captain Davidson planned on using El Faro's normal, direct route to San Juan, which he expected would pass south of Hurricane Joaquin; however, tropical storm and hurricane wind fields were forecast to be near the vessel's normal route.

At the time, Hurricane Joaquin was still a tropical storm, but meteorologists at the National Hurricane Center forecast that it would likely become a hurricane by the morning of October 1, on a southwest trajectory toward the Bahamas. The vessel's voyage plan took it within 175 nmi (320 km; 200 mi) of the storm, where seas in excess of 10 ft (3 m) were likely.

On September 30 at 6:40 a.m. after a review of updated weather data, Davidson and his chief mate decided to alter course slightly southward. Later, at 11:05 p.m., the third mate called Davidson and told him that maximum winds from Joaquin had increased to 100 mph and that the storm was moving toward El Faro's planned track-line. A few minutes later, at 11:13 p.m., the third mate called a second time and suggested a diversion to the south. The second mate, Danielle Randolph, also called Davidson at about 1:20 am on October 1 and suggested a course change through Crooked Island Passage. Randolph voiced concern in an email to friends and family: "There is a hurricane out here and we are heading straight into it."

=== Hurricane Joaquin ===
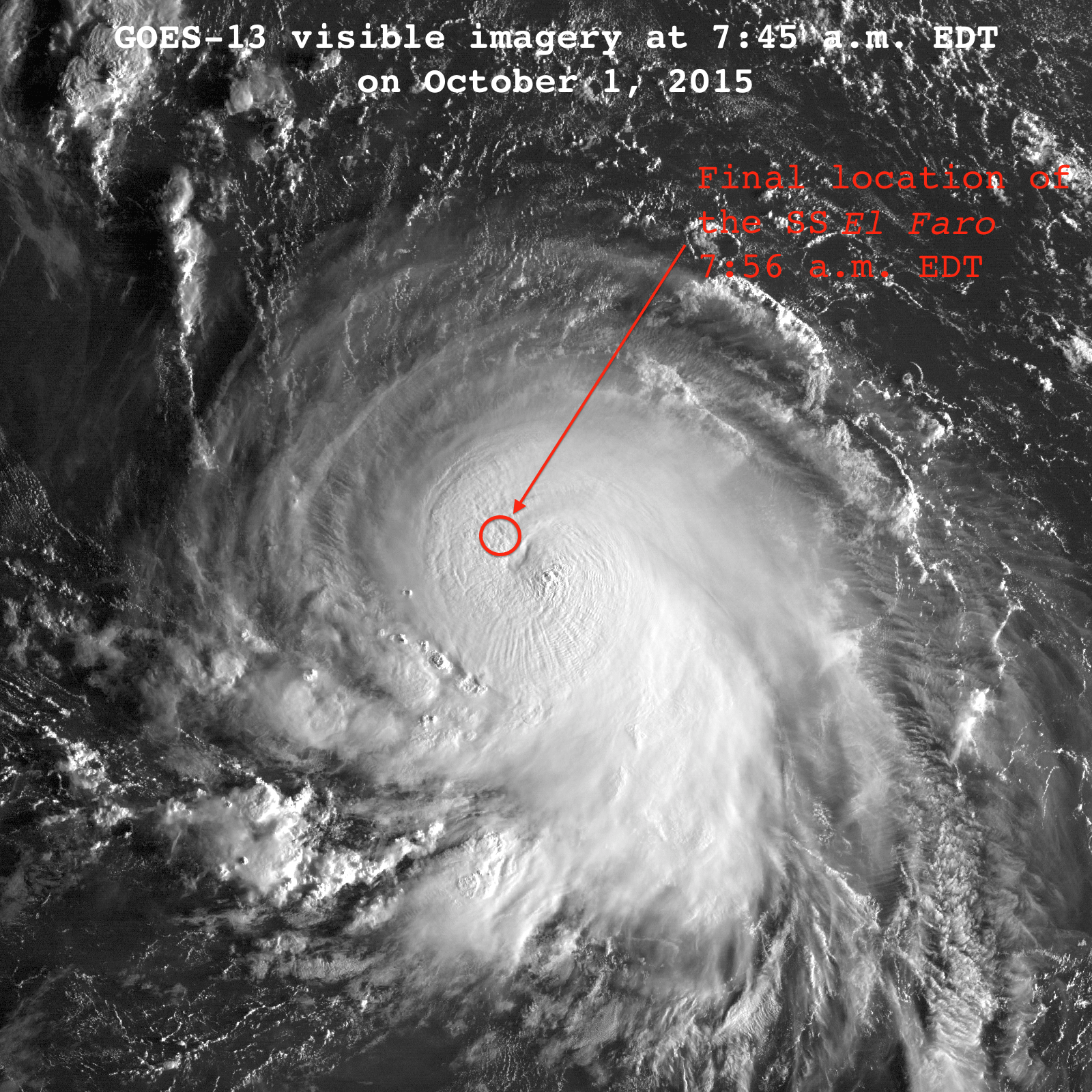
Satellite image at 11:45 UTC (7:45 a.m. EDT) on October 1 depicting the approximate final position of El Faro in relation to Hurricane Joaquin

Joaquin became a hurricane by 8:00 a.m. on September 30, then rapidly intensified. Throughout the rest of the day and into the morning of October 1, the storm continued to track southwest. By 11:00 pm, the storm had reached Category 3 intensity with maximum sustained winds of 100 kn (185 km/h; 115 mph).

Ten hours after departing from Jacksonville, El Faro had deviated from her charted course. Less than twenty hours later, at around 7:30 a.m. on October 1, the Coast Guard received a satellite notification that the vessel had lost propulsion, taken on water—though flooding was contained at the time of the message—and had a 15-degree list. The Coast Guard also received a single ping from the ship's Emergency Position Indicating Radio Beacon. Subsequent attempts to open communications with El Faro were unsuccessful.

Marine Traffic's last reported position for El Faro was 24.2747°N 74.94522°W at 4:01 a.m., heading south-southeast at 19 kn (35 km/h; 22 mph). According to a different marine positioning database, relayed by Reuters, the final relayed position of El Faro was 23.52°N 74.02°W at 7:56 a.m., about 35 nmi (65 km; 40 mi) northeast of Crooked Island. This placed the vessel within the eyewall of the hurricane, situated near 23.2°N 73.7°W at 8:00 a.m., where winds in excess of 80 kn (150 km/h; 92 mph) and waves of 20 to 30 ft (6 to 9 m) likely battered the ship.

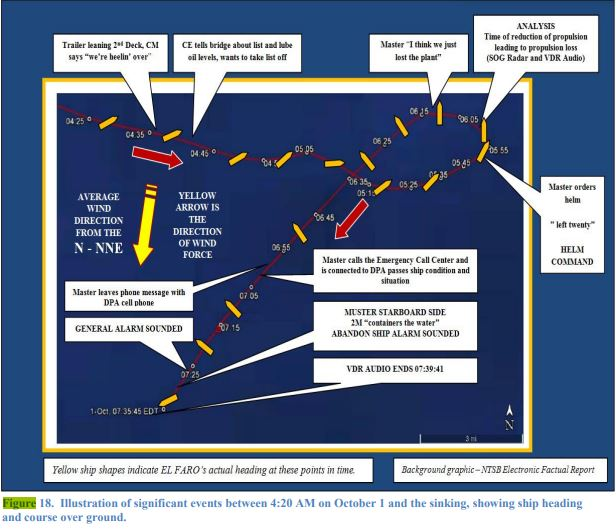
Significant events between 4:20 on October 1 and the sinking, showing El Faro's heading and course over ground

==== Voyage data recorder audio ====
On December 13, 2016, the NTSB released a 500-page transcript of the conversations that occurred on the bridge in the ship's final twenty-six hours, as recorded by the vessel's voyage data recorder (VDR) and its six microphones.

The transcript described a quickly deteriorating situation. At 5:43 a.m. on the morning of the sinking, Davidson took a phone call indicating suspected flooding in the no. 3 cargo hold and sent the chief mate to investigate. The crew began taking measures to try to assess and control the flooding. Thirty minutes later, the ship lost its steam propulsion plant. At 6:54 a.m., Davidson took a phone call describing the situation on board:

- "It's miserable right now. We got all the uhh—all the wind on the starboard side here. Now a scuttle was left open or popped open or whatever so we got some flooding down in three hold—a significant amount. Umm, everybody's safe right now, we're not gonna abandon ship—we're gonna stay with the ship. We are in dire straits right now. Okay, I'm gonna call the office and tell 'em [unintelligible]. Okay? Umm there's no need to ring the general alarm yet—we're not abandoning ship. The engineers are trying to get the plant back. So we're working on it—okay?"

At 7:06 a.m., Davidson made a phone call, stating:

- "I have a marine emergency and I would like to speak with a QI (Qualified Individual). We had a hull breach- a scuttle blew open during the storm. We have water down in three hold. We have a heavy list. We've lost the main propulsion unit. The engineers cannot get it goin'. Can I speak with a QI please?"
- "We have uhh secured the source of water coming into the vessel. Uh, A scuttle was blown open ... it's since been closed. However, uh, three hold's got a considerable amount of water in it. Uh, we have a very, very healthy port list. The engineers cannot get lube oil pressure on the plant, therefore we've got no main engine, and let me give you, um, a latitude and longitude. I just wanted to give you a heads up before I push that- push that button."
- "The crew is safe. Right now we're trying to save the ship now, but, uh, all available hands. We are forty-eight miles east of San Salvador. We are taking every measure to take the list off. By that I mean pump out that- pump out that hold the best we can but we are not gaining ground at this time."
- "Right now it's a little hard to tell because all the wind is ... on that side too so we got a good wind heel goin'. But it's not getting any better."
- "[We're] gonna stay with the ship ... no one's panicking, everybody's been made aware ... Our safest bet is to stay with the ship during this particular time. The weather is ferocious out here and we're gonna stay with the ship ... swell is out the northeast, a solid ten to twelve feet (over) spray, high winds, very poor visibility ..."

At 7:10 a.m., Davidson told someone on the phone that the ship was caught in a 10- to 15-degree list, "but a lot of that's with the wind heel". He informed the person that he would be making a distress call to the Coast Guard, and then directed the second mate to activate El Faro's Ship Security Alert System and Global Maritime Distress and Safety System. He then directed the rest of the crew to wake up.

At 7:15 a.m., the chief mate returned to the bridge:

- Chief mate: "I think that the water level's rising, Captain."
- Captain: "(okay). Do you know where it's comin' from?"
- Chief Mate: "(At) first the Chief said something hit the fire main. Got it ruptured. Hard."
- Captain: "Um, there's no way to secure that?"
- Chief Mate: "We don't know if they still have any pressure on the fire main or not. Don't know where's sea – between the sea suction and the hull or what, uh, but anything I say is a guess."

At 7:17 a.m., the chief engineer informed the chief mate and the captain over the sound-powered phone that the bilge alarm was going off in "two alpha". The captain asked the chief mate if he could pump out all of the cargo holds at the same time and discussed the worsening list. The chief mate replied that the cars were floating in the #3 cargo hold and that the fire main was below the surface of the water, so he could not see the damage or if water was still coming in. Two minutes later, after further discussion with the chief mate, the captain called the chief engineer and asked, "Can you ... isolate the fire main from down in the uh engine room? ... On the engine room side the isolation valve [on the] suction [for the] fire pump ... secure it, isolate it on your side so there's no free communication from the sea."

At 7:24 a.m., Davidson, with a crew member on the phone, said, "We still got reserve buoyancy and stability." He then instructed the second mate to ring the general alarm and wake up the crew. Davidson then gave the order to abandon ship, and about a minute later could be heard on the bridge calling out, "Bow is down, bow is down!" He then called over the UHF radio for the chief mate to "Get into your rafts! Throw all your rafts into the water! Everybody get off! Get off the ship! Stay together!"

For the next several minutes, Davidson tried to help a panicked helmsman get off the bridge, with alarms ringing all around. The captain repeatedly told the helmsman not to panic: "Work your way up here", "You're okay, come on", and "I'm not leavin' you, let's go!". The helmsman exclaimed, "I need a ladder! A line!" and "I need someone to help me!". The VDR recording ends at 7:39 a.m. with the captain and the helmsman still on the bridge. The final words recorded were from Davidson to the helmsman one second before the end of the recording, "It's time to come this way!"

=== Search operations ===
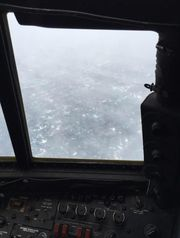
Conditions during the search for El Faro on October 2 as seen from a Coast Guard HC-130

On October 1, WC-130J Super Hercules aircraft of the U.S. Air Force Reserve 53rd Weather Reconnaissance Squadron tried to locate El Faro without success. On October 2, a Coast Guard HC-130H Hercules aircraft from Coast Guard Air Station Clearwater in Florida began a dedicated search for the ship. USCGC Northland and an MH-60T Jayhawk helicopter from CGAS Clearwater joined search efforts later that day. MH-65C Dolphin helicopters from Coast Guard Air Station Miami in Florida and Coast Guard Air Station Borinquen in Puerto Rico, along with HC-144A Ocean Sentry fixed-wing patrol aircraft from Miami, were also present.

Throughout October 3, aircraft flew in violent hurricane conditions, characterized by winds in excess of 100 kn (185 km/h; 115 mph) at an altitude of 1,000 ft (300 m), waves up to 40 ft (12 m), and visibility less than 1 nmi (1.9 km; 1.2 mi). Despite the hazardous conditions, a helicopter crew recovered a life ring from El Faro. Conditions markedly improved on October 4 as Joaquin moved northeast, away from the Bahamas; winds averaged 15 kn (28 km/h; 17 mph) and visibility was unlimited. Taking advantage of the clear weather, the helicopter remained in flight for eleven hours, requiring refueling twice. A second HC-130, USCGC Charles Sexton, and USCGC Resolute were deployed that day.

Northland and Resolute continued operations overnight with engineers using night vision goggles to take part in the search. The United States Navy provided a P-8A Poseidon aircraft from Naval Air Station Jacksonville to assist on October 3; three Crowley Maritime tugboats also joined. Search operations were conducted at a near-continuous pace by this date.

On 4:57 pm on October 4, the P-8A Poseidon located an orange immersion suit approximately 40 nautical miles west-northwest of El Faro's last known position. Using the information supplied by the P-8A Poseidon, a Coast Guard MH-60T located the suit around 90 minutes later. The MH-60T lowered a rescue diver, who discovered a corpse inside the suit which was in such an advanced state of decomposition that its gender and ethnicity was unrecognizable; the corpse's head was also three times the normal size. The corpse was possibly Davidson, as most of El Faro's crew were mustering below decks at the time of the sinking and the bridge was the last part of the ship to go under. Before the MH-60T's crew could retrieve the corpse, they were informed that the P-8A Poseidon had discovered another immersion suit approximately 30 nautical miles with a possible survivor inside, and headed to the second suit's location. The MH-60T's diver left a self-locating datum marker buoy on the corpse to mark its position. However, when the helicopter returned its crew was unable to relocate the corpse due to the buoy failing. Several other unopened immersion suits were recovered.

A deflated life raft and an unoccupied, heavily damaged lifeboat—one of two aboard El Faro, each capable of carrying 43 people and stocked with food and water for a few days—were also found on October 5. The vessel was declared lost at sea on this day, believed to have sunk in 15,000 ft (4,600 m) of water, and the search turned into a search and recovery effort.

The U.S. Air Force and Air National Guard provided three additional HC-130P/J aircraft on October 6. A total of 183,000 sq nmi (630,000 km^{2}; 242,000 sq mi) of water was covered in search of the vessel. Two debris fields were discovered: one covering 260 sq nmi (890 km^{2}) situated near El Faro's final position, and the other spanning 61 sq nmi (210 km^{2}) located 60 nmi (110 km) northeast of the first debris field. At sunset on October 7, the Coast Guard announced the cessation of search operations.

== Aftermath ==
On October 7, a Navy salvage team was requested to search for the wreckage at the behest of the NTSB. Senator Bill Nelson of Florida wrote a letter to the agency urging them to look into TOTE's policies regarding severe weather. Nelson also cited that El Faro's lifeboats were "outdated and inadequate for the conditions the crew faced". TOTE established a fund for families of the crew on October 9 through the Seamen's Church Institute of New York and New Jersey. The Coast Guard in its enforcement activity 5752773 report recommended to fine Tote a total of $5,350 for five code violations.

On October 14, a $100 million lawsuit was filed against TOTE by a family member of one of the missing crew, citing negligence on the company's behalf in letting a non-seaworthy vessel sail into a hurricane. On October 28, another lawsuit was filed on behalf of the estate of a man who died in the sinking. The complaint stated that "without power, the M/V EL FARO was merely a cork in the sea as the Hurricane neared". By April 19, 2016, TOTE Maritime had settled with 18 of the 33 families for more than $7 million.

MV Isla Bella was chosen to replace El Faro's former operations.

Writer William Langewiesche stated that the fact that El Faro was flagged to the United States, the fact that the ship sailed into a hurricane despite having the capacity to avoid it, and that the captain was "respected", all gave "immediate attention" to the incident.

=== Search for the wreckage ===
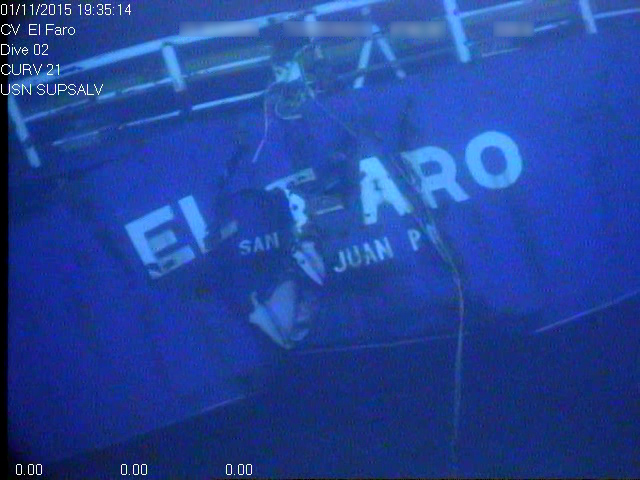
A Navy screen capture showing the stern of El Faro.

On October 19, USNS Apache departed from Joint Expeditionary Base Little Creek–Fort Story in Virginia Beach, Virginia, to conduct an underwater search for El Faro. The vessel was equipped with a towed pinger locator, side-scan sonar, and a remotely operated vehicle. The search crew identified a vessel on October 31 at an approximate depth of 15,400 ft (4,700 m). The hydrostatic pressure at this depth is approximately 6,688 pounds per square inch (46 MPa).

The NTSB reported that the object was "consistent with a [790 ft (240 m)] cargo ship ... in an upright position and in one piece". On November 16, the wreck was confirmed to be El Faro, and the agency announced it had completed its search of the sunken ship but did not find the VDR. On January 3, 2016, the NTSB opened the public accident docket on the investigation into the sinking, initially releasing underwater images and video of the vessel.

==== Second and third search effort for VDR ====
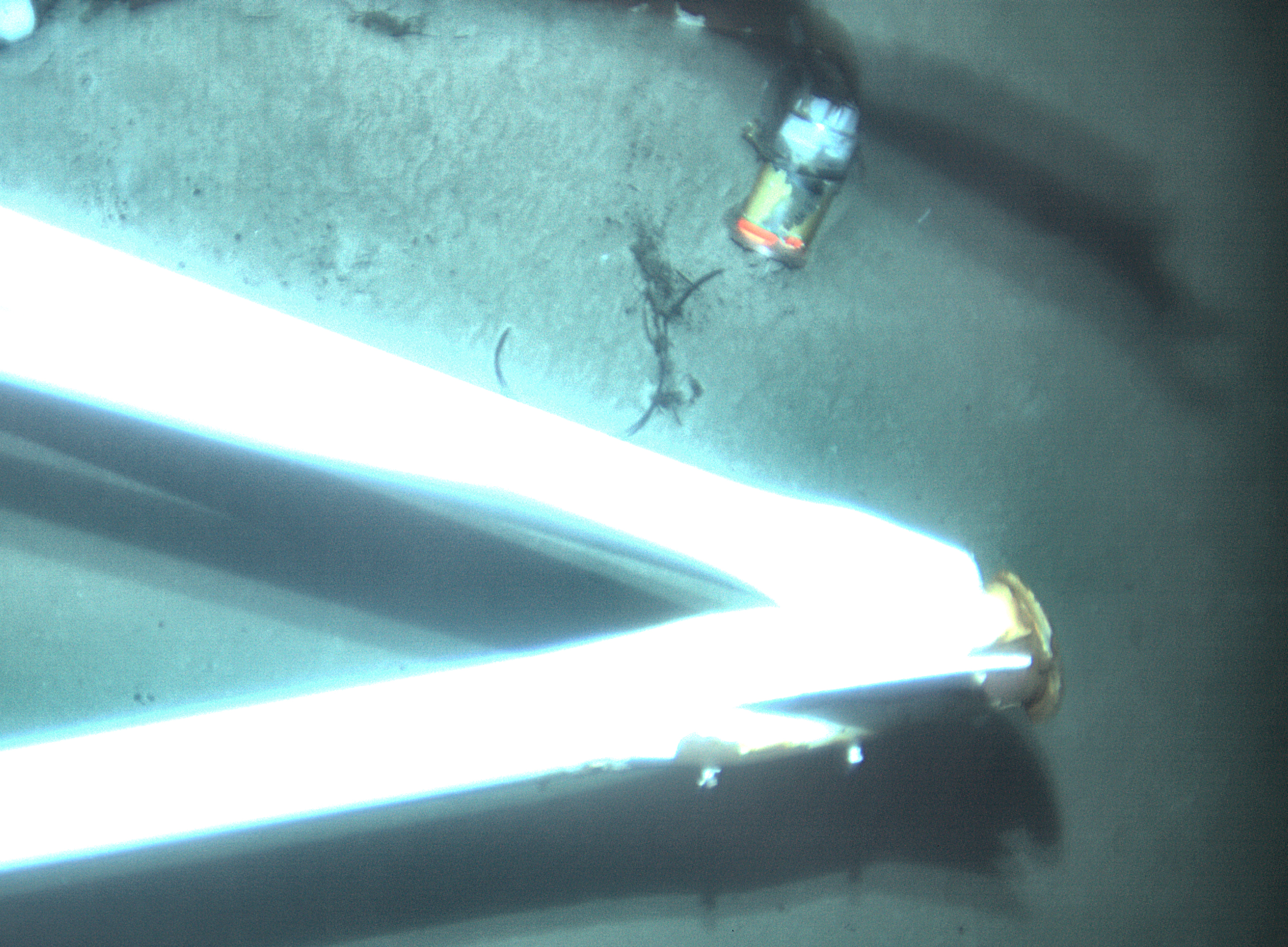
The VDR sitting on the ocean floor next to the mast.

On April 18, 2016, the NTSB launched a second search for the VDR, using the RV Atlantis, a Navy-owned vessel operated by mariners of Woods Hole Oceanographic Institution. On April 26, the NTSB said the VDR was found about 41 mi (66 km) northeast of Acklins and Crooked Islands, Bahamas. The agency was unable to retrieve the recorder at that time because it was too close to the ship's mast and other obstructions.

On August 5, 2016, USNS Apache returned to the site and, five days later, recovered the VDR. Ten months after the sinking, the VDR was delivered to the NTSB in Mayport, Florida to continue the investigation.

=== Findings of investigation reports ===
==== U.S. Coast Guard ====
The Coast Guard's El Faro Marine Board of Investigation completed its final report on September 24, 2017, and published it on October 1 in its document library. The 199-page Marine Board's Report detailed facts, analysis, and conclusions and made safety, administrative and enforcement recommendations.

Coast Guard investigators placed nearly all of the blame on Captain Davidson of El Faro, who had underestimated both the strength of the storm and the ship's vulnerability in rough weather, and did not take enough measures to evade the storm even though his crew raised concerns about its increasing strength and changing direction. Investigators stated that if Davidson had survived the storm, his actions would have been grounds for the Coast Guard to revoke his captain's license. Davidson "was ultimately responsible for the vessel, the crew and its safe navigation", said Capt. Jason Neubauer, who chaired the investigation.

Coast Guard investigators also noted that TOTE Maritime, El Faro's owner, made several violations regarding crew members' rest periods and work hours, had no dedicated safety officer to oversee the ship, and used outdated, "open air" lifeboats (similar to the types used on older vessels, such as Titanic) instead of the modern-day enclosed survival crafts, among other violations.

Following the incident, Regional Commander of the Coast Guard Captain Jeff Dixon switched sides, despite Coast Guard lifetime ban rules on switching sides and became the President of TOTE Services.

==== NTSB ====
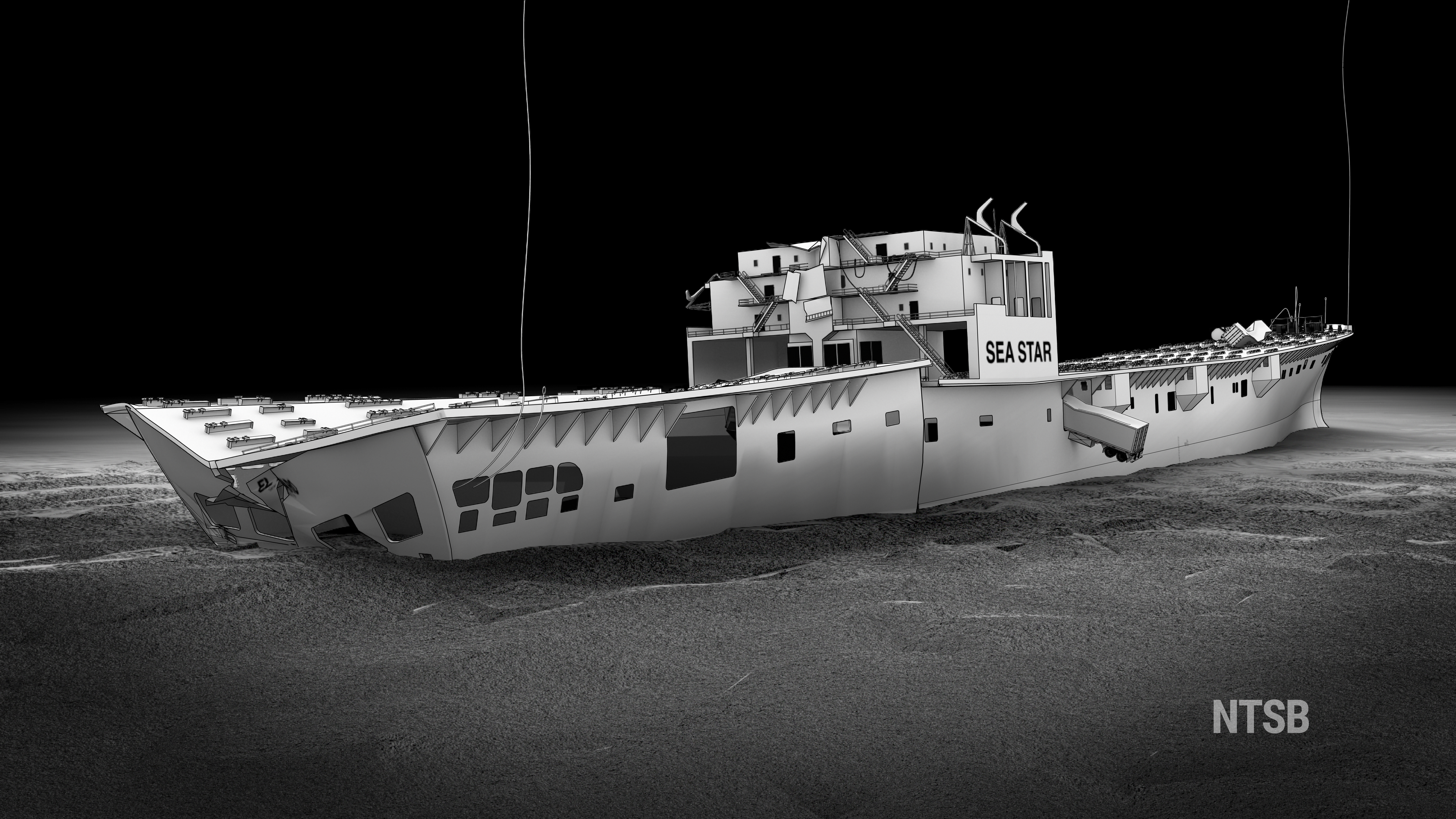
An NTSB model of El Faro's resting place on the seafloor

The NTSB met in Washington, D.C., on December 12, 2017, to discuss contributing factors to the sinking as well as to "vote on recommendations to address safety issues uncovered during the investigation". The board meeting was webcast live. The board's 400-page report:

- criticized Captain Davidson's decision to advance into the oncoming storm, despite numerous calls from the crew to alter course, and noted he had relied on outdated weather information from a commercial service, Bon Voyage System
- criticized the Coast Guard's practices of grandfathering in vessels, exempting them from using closed lifeboats; the obsolete lifeboats were not properly maintained, were not launched, and in all probability would not have offered useful shelter
- noted TOTE's failure to maintain a superannuated and deteriorating vessel

In their final report, the NTSB determined

that the probable cause of the sinking of El Faro and the subsequent loss of life was the captain's insufficient action to avoid Hurricane Joaquin, his failure to use the most current weather information, and his late decision to muster the crew. Contributing to the sinking was ineffective bridge resource management on board El Faro, which included the captain's failure to adequately consider officers' suggestions. Also contributing to the sinking was the inadequacy of both TOTE's oversight and its safety management system. Further contributing factors ... were flooding in a cargo hold from an undetected open watertight scuttle and damaged seawater piping; loss of propulsion due to low lube oil pressure to the main engine resulting from a sustained list; and subsequent downflooding through unsecured ventilation closures to the cargo holds. Also contributing ... was the lack of an approved damage control plan ... Contributing to the loss of life was the lack of appropriate survival craft for the conditions.

==== Memorials ====
Twin memorials remembering El Faro's crew were erected in Jacksonville and in San Juan.

There is another memorial located in Rockland, Maine by artist Jay Sawyer. Five people from the Rockland area died on the El Faro.

A memorial plaque is also installed on the pier in Gdynia, Poland. Five of the El Faro crew were Polish nationals.

An El Faro Memorial was dedicated at the Star Center (located on the American Maritime Officers Plans campus) on September 29, 2018, in Dania Beach, Florida.

In Jay, Maine the hometown of Michael Holland, one of those lost on the ship, a memorial school tennis facility was opened in October of 2026. The Holland Strong Tennis Courts at Spruce Mountain were funded to the tune of $600,000 by local fund raising activities.

=== Hamm Alert Maritime Safety Act ===
In 2019 the Hamm Alert Maritime Safety Act was passed by Congress. It was named after one of the deceased of El Faro's sinking. It contained the following:

Cargo ships will be required to receive timely weather forecasts, including alerts for hurricanes. They'll need emergency gear with location beacons and an anonymous system where crew members can report problems.

— CBS News

== See also ==
- List of Bermuda Triangle incidents
- List of disasters in the United States by death toll
- List of maritime disasters in the 21st century
- List of roll-on/roll-off vessel accidents
- List of shipwrecks in 2015
- List of shipwrecks of North America
