= MV Isla Bella =

Container ship built in 2015

History

United States
- Name: Isla Bella
- Owner: TOTE Maritime
- Operator: TOTE Services
- Port of registry: United States
- Route: Jacksonville, Florida to Puerto Rico
- Builder: National Steel and Shipbuilding Company
- Christened: 18 April 2015
- Completed: October 2015
- Maiden voyage: 18 April 2015
- In service: 19 October 2015
- Identification: Call sign:WTOI; IMO number: 9680841; MMSI number: 338760000
- Status: Operational

General characteristics
- Class & type: Marlin
- Tonnage: 36,751 GT
- Length: 764 feet
- Beam: 106 feet

Isla Bella and her sister ship Perla del Caribe are the world's first liquefied natural gas (LNG)-powered container ships. Isla Bella is currently used as part of the Florida-Puerto Rico trade, sailing out of Jacksonville, Florida and arriving in San Juan, Puerto Rico on a weekly basis. Both ships were built by NASSCO for TOTE Maritime Puerto Rico and replaced the last of the Ponce-class ships that were previously used for the route. They cost US$324 million to build and each is propelled by a single slow-speed engine capable of 25,191 kW at 104 rpm, which propels the ships at a maximum speed of 22 knots.

Isla Bella has a length of 764 feet and is 106 feet in width. It has a capacity of 3,100 TEU but can carry 20-foot, 30-foot, 40-foot, 45-foot and 53-foot containers. Isla Bella was christened on April 18 before a crowd of 3,400 people. The name Isla Bella is Spanish for “beautiful island”. The name of the vessel comes from Paola Dominguez as part of a partnership with The Puerto Rico Boys & Girls Club and TOTE.

== Engine and fuel ==
Isla Bella's engine is powered by a single slow-speed MAN B&W 8L70ME-GI dual fuel gas engine. This engine operates on a mixture of LNG and diesel fuel oil, the latter of which is used to ignite the natural gas. The engines are designed to run on as little as 3 percent pilot oil. The result is a 97 percent reduction in sulfur oxides and a 98 percent nitrogen oxide reduction in particulate matter coming from the exhausts. To fuel this engine two 900 cubic meter cryogenic tanks are located aft of the house. The combined weight of these two tanks is 760 tons. These eighty-four-foot-long tanks hold a combined total of 475,000 gallons of LNG.

For the first few years, the ship was refueled from trucks. As of 2018, a dedicated LNG bunker barge and a LNG liquefication plant are being built for the Isla Bella and Perla del Caribe.
