= SS Great Land =

History
- Name: SS Great Land
- Owner: Tote Maritime
- Launched: 17 June 1975
- Maiden voyage: 10 September, 1975
- Out of service: 2011
- Identification: IMO number: 7420493; Callsign: WFDP
- Fate: Broken up 12 May 2013

General characteristics
- Class & type: Ponce ≈
- Type: roll-on/roll-off
- Length: 790 feet
- Capacity: 950 automobiles and 100 containers on chassis.

The SS Great Land was a 790-foot, roll-on/roll-off ship. According to the News Tribune, the "Great Land’s initial call at Tacoma in 1976 was celebrated as a major victory for the port over its rival Seattle in becoming the gateway to Alaska."

== Anchorage collision ==
On March 17, 1985, during the vessel's approach on Cook Inlet and Knik Arm to Terminal 3 at the Port of Anchorage City Docks, the Great Land struck Terminal 3.
