= MV Cape Henry =

Cape H-class roll-on/roll-off

Coordinates: 37.7410565°N 122.3682768°W

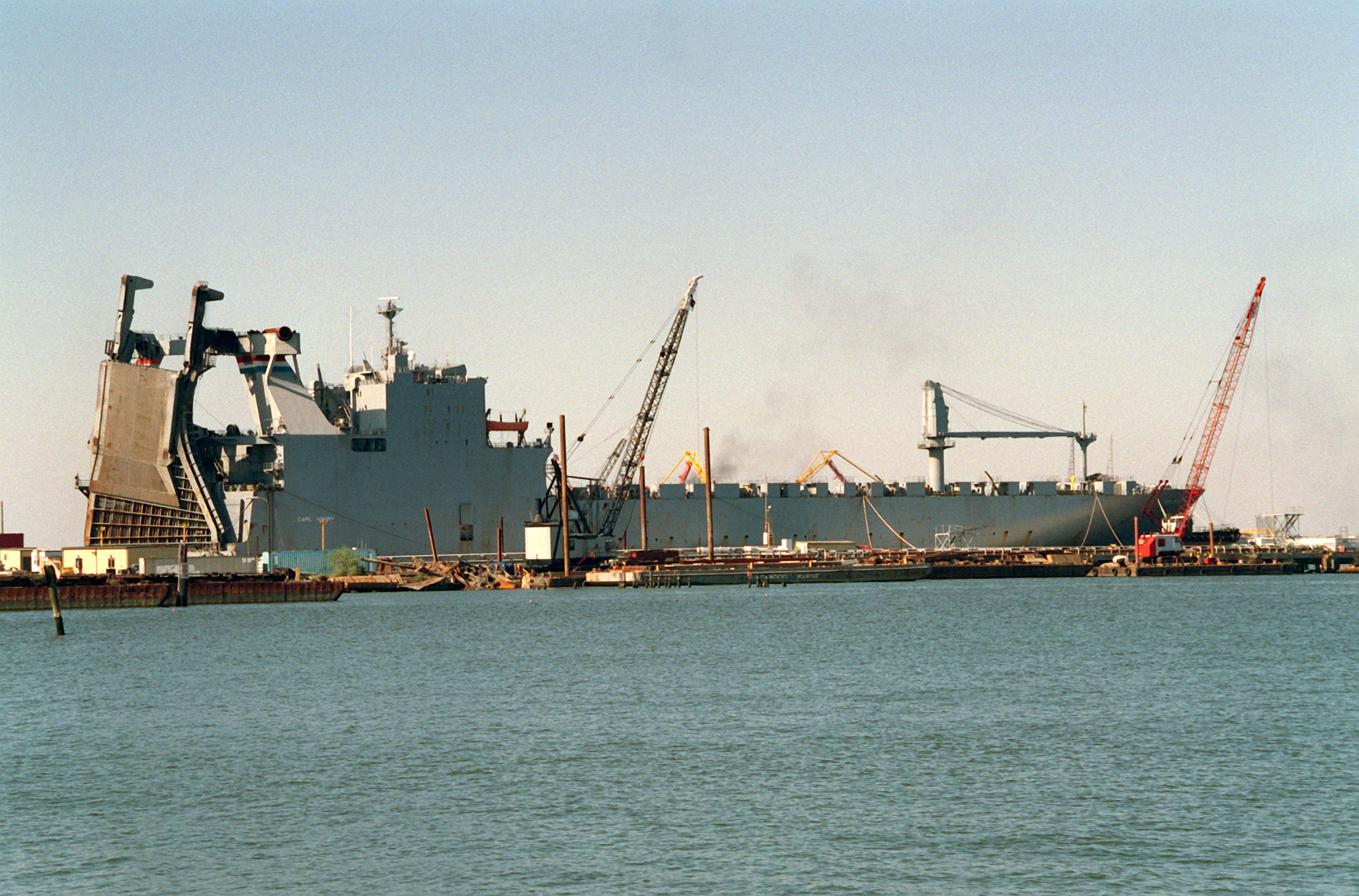
- MV Cape Henry on 2 October 1993

History

United States
- Name: Cape Henry
- Namesake: Cape Henry
- Owner: United States Department of Transportation United States Maritime Administration
- Operator: TOTE Maritime
- Builder: Mitsubishi Heavy Industries, Nagasaki, Japan
- Launched: 17 November 1978
- Completed: 1979
- Acquired: 30 September 1986
- Commissioned: 30 September 1986
- Renamed: from Barber Priam
- Identification: IMO number: 7724083; MMSI number: 303943000; Callsign: KMJH; Pennant number: T-AKR-5067
- Status: Laid in San Francisco, in ROS-5 status

General characteristics
- Class & type: Cape H-class roll-on/roll-off
- Tonnage: 39,889 GT
- Displacement: 51,007 long tons
- Length: 749 ft (228 m)
- Beam: 105 ft (32 m)
- Draft: 35 ft (11 m)
- Propulsion: Diesel, single propeller
- Speed: 17.4 knots
- Range: Not Disclosed
- Complement: 27 civilian mariners
- Armament: none
- Armor: none
- Aircraft carried: none

MV Cape Henry (T-AKR-5067) is a roll-on/roll-off cargo ship. She has two sister ships: MV Cape Hudson and MV Cape Horn.

== Construction and career ==
The Cape Henry was originally built as a commercial ship in 1979 and sold to the Ocean Transport and Trading Co. with the name Barber Priam. It served as a merchant ship until it was purchased by the US Department of Transportation, Maritime Administration, on 30 September 1986. She was operated under contract by Marine Transport Lines of Weehawken, Pacific Gulf Marine of Metairie, Matson Inc. of Honululu, and Patriot Contract Services of Concord.

She was anchored in the Bay of Gibraltar on 18 May 1993.

It was later transferred to the Maritime Administrations Ready reserve fleet and assigned to San Francisco. MV Cape Henry's current operator is Tote Maritime of Jacksonville.
