= Walbert =

Walbert may refer to

- Saint Waldebert
- Kate Walbert, American writer
- William Burton Walbert, American musician
- Walbert, Missouri, a ghost town
- Walbert IV, Frankish saint
- Walbert Ureña, Dominican baseball player

== See also ==
- John Gualbert
- Walberto
