= MV Cape Horn =

Cape H-class roll-on/roll-off

Coordinates: 37.7730888°N 122.3814327°W

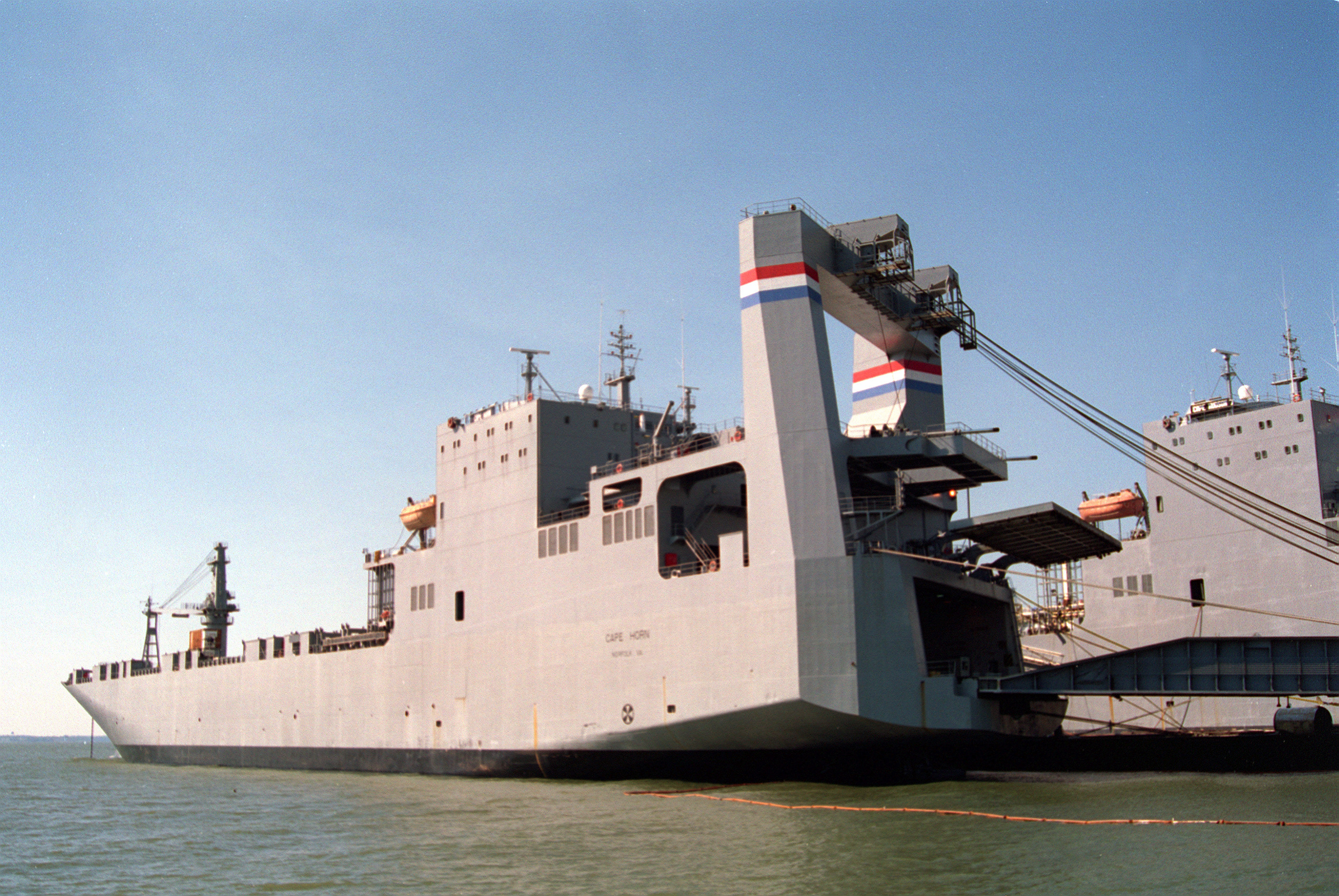
- MV Cape Horn on 2 October 1993

History

United States
- Name: Cape Horn
- Namesake: Cape Horn
- Owner: United States Department of Transportation United States Maritime Administration
- Operator: TOTE Maritime
- Builder: Tangen Verft, Kragerø, Norway
- Launched: 31 January 1979
- Completed: 1979
- Acquired: December 1986
- Commissioned: December 1986
- Renamed: from Barber Tonsberg
- Identification: IMO number: 7704942; MMSI number: 303944000; Callsign: KMJS; Pennant number: T-AKR-5068
- Status: Laid in San Francisco, in ROS-5 status

General characteristics
- Class & type: Cape H-class roll-on/roll-off
- Tonnage: 39,889 GT
- Displacement: 51,007 long tons
- Length: 749 feet
- Beam: 105 feet inches
- Draft: 35 feet
- Propulsion: Diesel, single propeller
- Speed: 17.4 knots
- Range: Not Disclosed
- Complement: 27 civilian mariners
- Armament: none
- Armor: none
- Aircraft carried: none

MV Cape Horn (T-AKR-5068) was originally built as a commercial ship in 1979 and sold to the Wilhelmsen Line with the name Barber Tonsberg. She has two sister ships: MV Cape Hudson and MV Cape Henry.

== Construction and career ==
It was a Norwegian-built, B&W, 9-cylinder, approximately 29000 SHP, low-speed direct drive, Swedish-operated merchant RO/RO ship until it was purchased by the U.S. Department of Transportation, Maritime Administration, in December 1986. Operated under contract by Marine Transport Lines of Weehawken.

On 15 April 1987, the ship was moored in Pusan for shipment back to the United States after the joint United States/South Korean Exercise TEAM SPIRIT '87.

In Aug 1990, the ship left San Francisco, Calif. transiting the Panama Canal enroute to Beaumont(Port Arthur), Texas to load a military cargo to be delivered to a Persian Gulf port in Saudi Arabia as part of Desert Shield. After delivering the first cargo, she proceed back stateside to Charlestown, South Carolina to load a partial military cargo and then proceed to Bayonne, New Jersey to complete the military cargo loading. After delivering the second cargo to Saudi Arabia, she proceed to Antwerp, Belgium in December 1990 to load a military cargo from West Germany. After delivering the third cargo, she proceed back stateside stopping at Port Said to await the Suez Canal Transit. On 17 Jan 1991 after the start of Desert Storm, she received a special order to proceed ASAP through the Suez Canal and headed to Jacksonville, Florida for special military cargo. After loading the special cargo. she proceed back to the Gulf and arrived after 28 Feb 1991 when the war ended. After a 2 week delay, she delivered part of her special cargo to Kuwait. She then proceeded back to Jacksonville, Florida.

MV Cape Horn was docked at a port facility in the Persian Gulf region on 19 October 1994. Army stevedores from the 567th Transportation Unit, Ft. Eustis, Virginia, were flown to the region to download the equipment from the ships in preparation for Operation Vigilant Warrior.

On 18 April 2005, she housed the military tactical vehicles for the 1st Marine Aircraft Wing, 12th Marines, and Combat Logistics Regiment 7 for exercise Cobra Gold.

From there it was later transferred to the Maritime Administrations Ready reserve fleet and assigned to San Francisco.

== Gallery ==
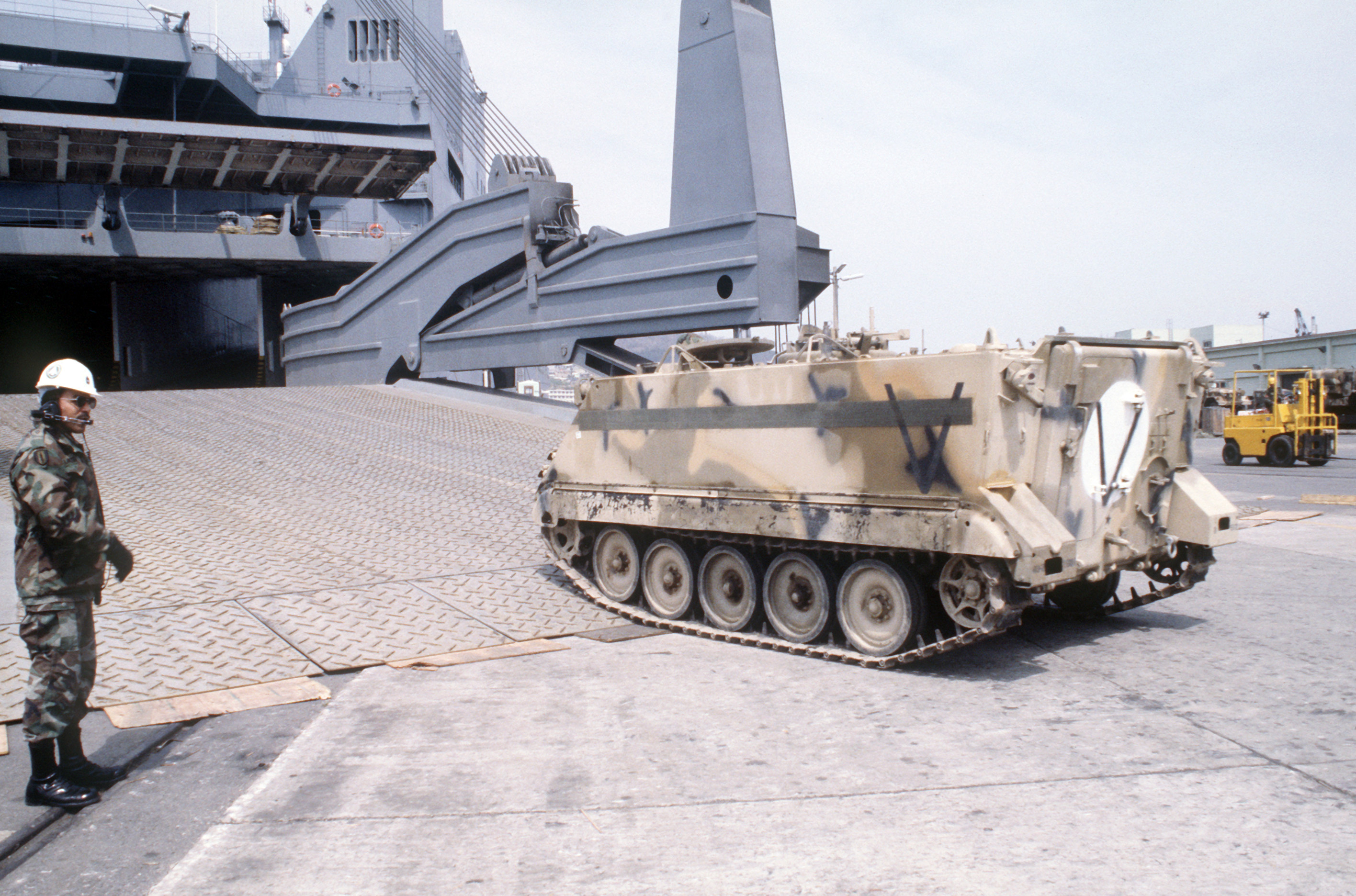
MV Cape Horn and M113 in South Korea on 15 April 1987.

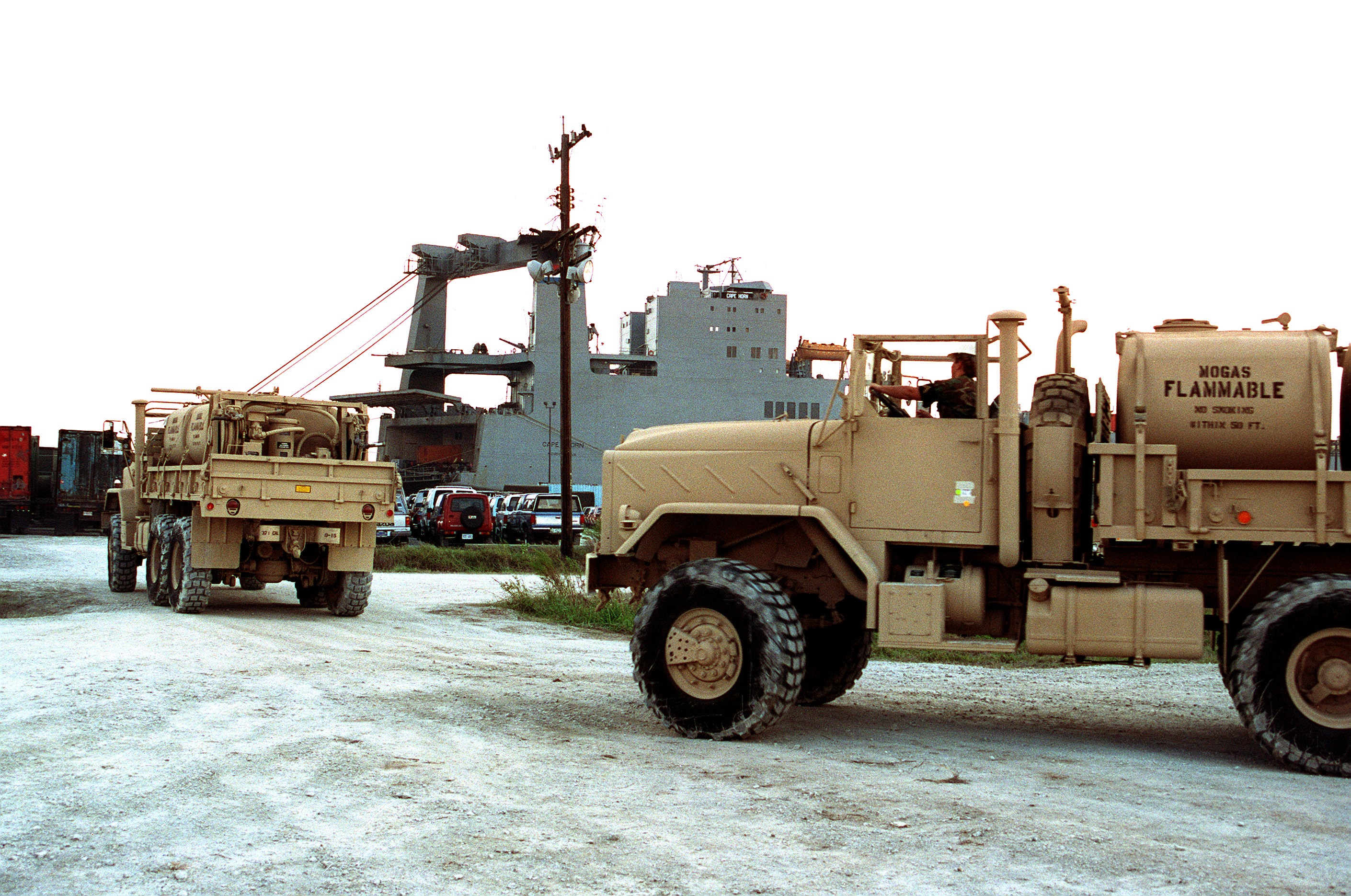
MV Cape Horn and M939 in Saudi Arabia on 8 November 1990.

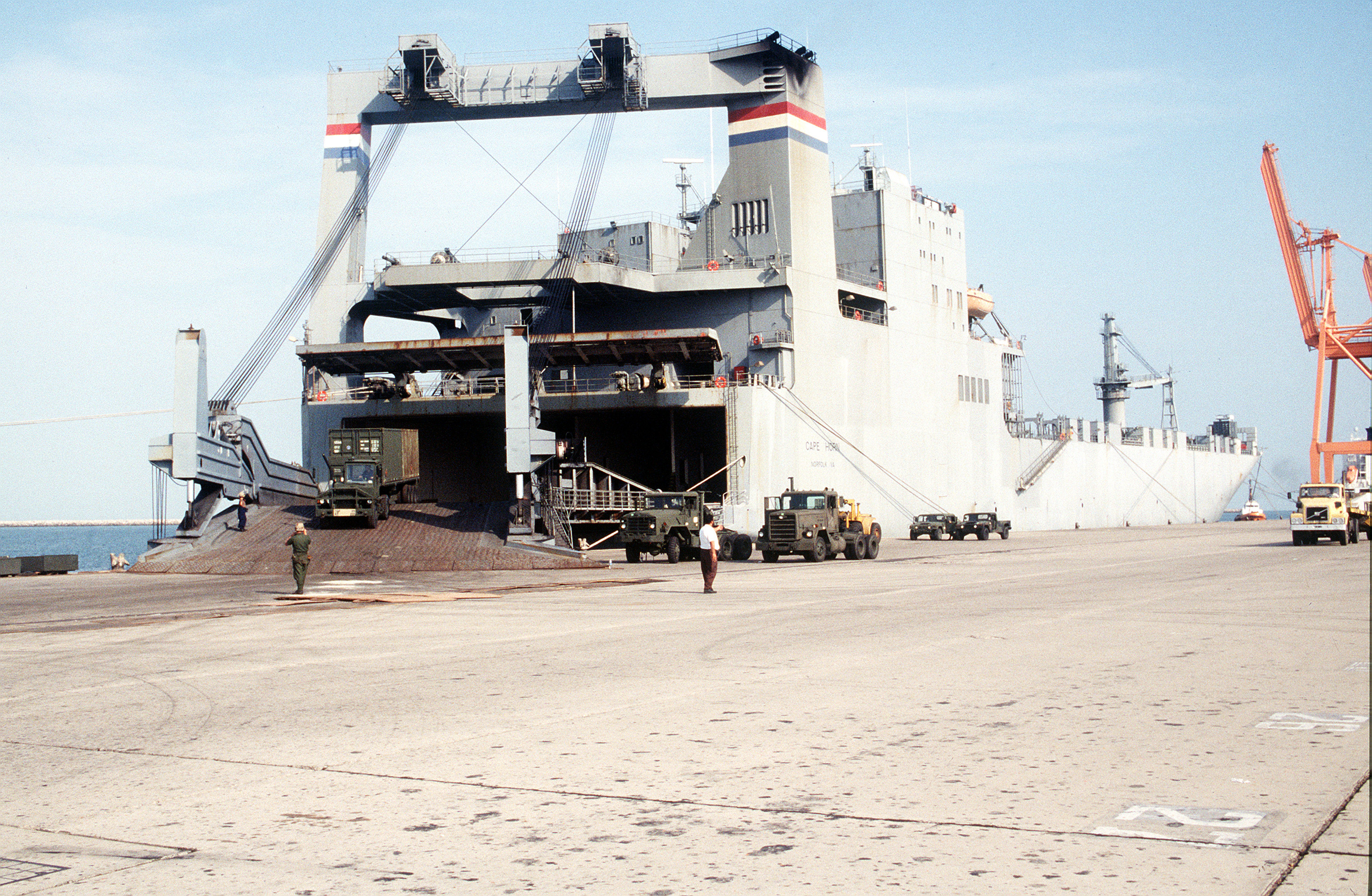
MV Cape Horn in Kuwait on 19 October 1994.

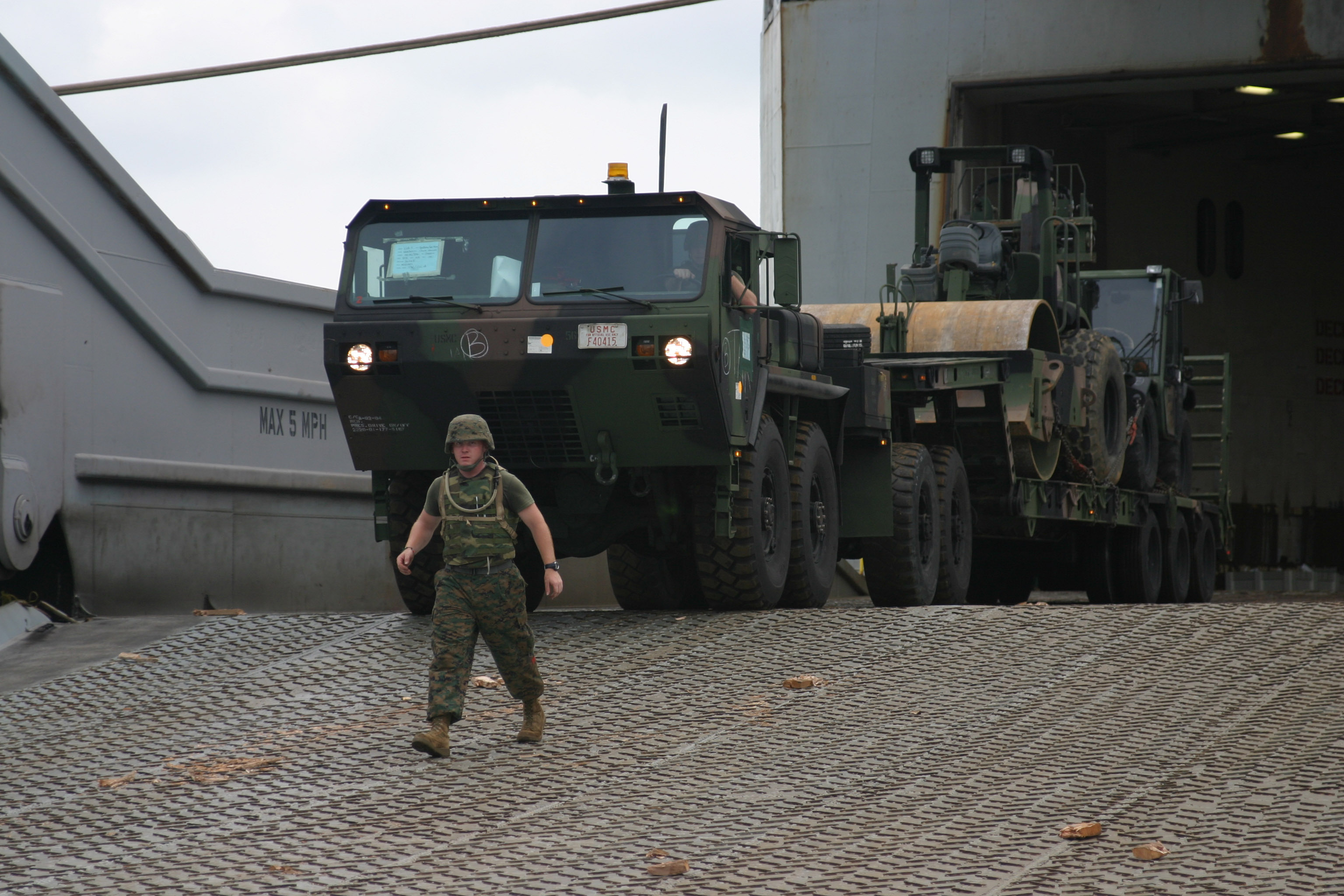
MV Cape Horn and M870 in Thailand on 18 April 2005.

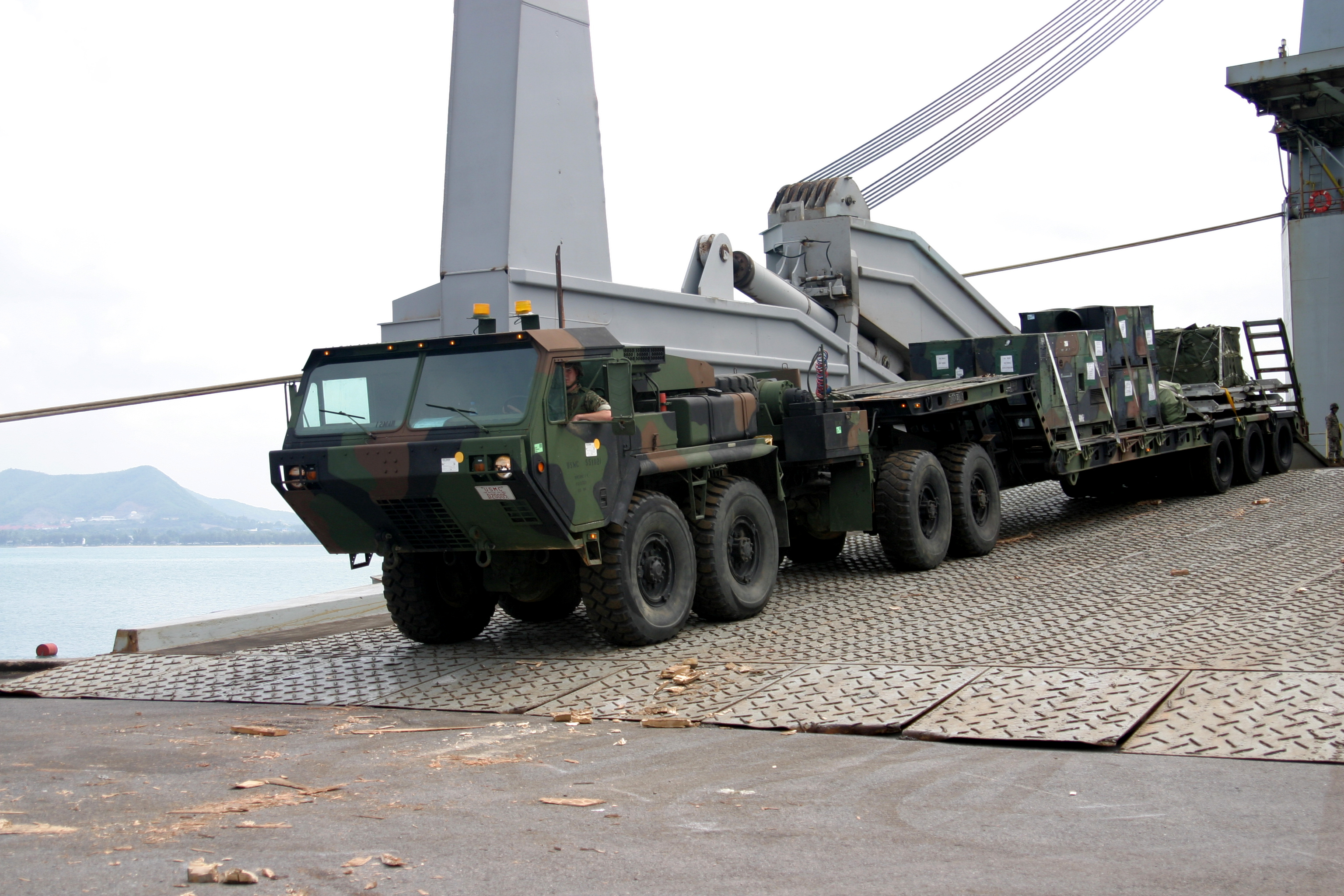
MV Cape Horn and M870 in Thailand on 18 April 2005.
