= TOTE Maritime =

US shipping company

- Formerly: Interocean Management Corporation
- Industry: Shipping
- Founded: 1975 as TOTEm Ocean Trailer Express
- Headquarters: 10401 Deerwood Park Blvd., Building One, Suite 1300, Jacksonville, Florida, United States
- Area served: North America
- Key people: Tim Nolan, CEO; Mike Noone, President, TOTE Maritime Puerto Rico; Grace Greene, President, TOTE Maritime Alaska
- Brands: TOTE Maritime, TOTE Services, TOTE Resources
- Services: shipping, crew staffing, cargo ship charters
- Parent: Saltchuk
- Website: www.totemaritime.com

TOTE Maritime is an owner/operator of domestic shipping in the United States. It specializes in moving cargo between North America to Puerto Rico and Alaska. TOTE Maritime Puerto Rico was the owner of El Faro, a large container ship that sank in 2015 after she steamed directly into Hurricane Joaquin.

== Subsidiaries ==
The Sea Star Line was a subsidiary of Tote Maritime, which was later unified under the then newly-established Tote Maritime brand alongside Totem Ocean Trailer Express.

== Fleet ==
Historic

- SS Great Land 1975 - Ponce-Class roll-on/roll-off ship, decommissioned after 2010 and sent to be broken up in 2013
- 6 Very Large Crude Carriers - operated by Interocean Management Corporation (now Tote Services) from 1975 to 1980
- 3 Liberty Class ships - operated by Interocean Management Corporation (now Tote Services) from 1975 to 1980
- SS Westward Venture 1977 - Ponce-Class Ro/RO ship
- SS Northern Lights 1975, renamed 1991 and acquired in 1993; became SS El Faro in 2006 and sank in 2015
- SS El Morro 1974 - sister to El Faro, scrapped in 2012 after a Coast Guard inspection revealed the ship was structurally unsound.
- SS El Yunque 1976 - sister to El Faro, scrapped in 2017 after a Coast Guard inspection revealed the ventilation trunks had rusted away.

Current

List of ships owned by TOTE:

- 2 tug and barge set - acquired 1985
- 2 tug and barge set - acquired 1990
- MV Midnight Sun 2002 - Orca Class ship (to be converted as LNG 2016)
- MV North Star 2003 - Orca Class ship (to be converted as LNG 2016)

Tote Maritime is notable for ordering the world's first LNG-powered container ships:

- MV Isla Bella launched on 15 April 2015
- MV Perla del Caribe on August 31, 2015.

In addition to the ships listed above, Tote Maritime operates the following ships that are part of the Ready Reserve Force:

- MV Cape Taylor, MV Cape Texas, and MV Cape Trinity - RORO vessels laid up in Beaumont, Texas.
- SS Pacific Tracker and MV Pacific Collector - Missile Range Instrumentation vessels laid up in Portland, Oregon.
- MV Gary I. Gordon and MV Charles L. Gilliland - Large, Medium Speed Roll on/Roll off vessels laid up in Baltimore, Maryland.
- MV Cape Sable, MV Cape San Juan, and MV Cape Starr - RORO vessels laid up in San Francisco, California.
- MV Cape Henry, MV Cape Hudson, and MV Cape Horn - RORO vessels laid up in San Francisco, California.

== Sinking of El Faro ==
The SS El Faro was lost with all hands after entering the eye wall of Hurricane Joaquin and losing power between Florida and the Bahamas on October 1, 2015. Coast Guard investigators lambasted TOTE Maritime, stating the company made several violations regarding crew members' rest periods and work hours, had no dedicated safety officer to oversee the El Faro, and used outdated, "open air" lifeboats (similar to the types used on older vessels, such as the RMS Titanic) instead of the modern enclosed survival craft, among other violations. The company never filed an internal incident and investigation record for the sinking.
