= MV Cape Hudson =

Cape H-class roll-on/roll-off

Coordinates: 37.7730888°N 122.3814327°W

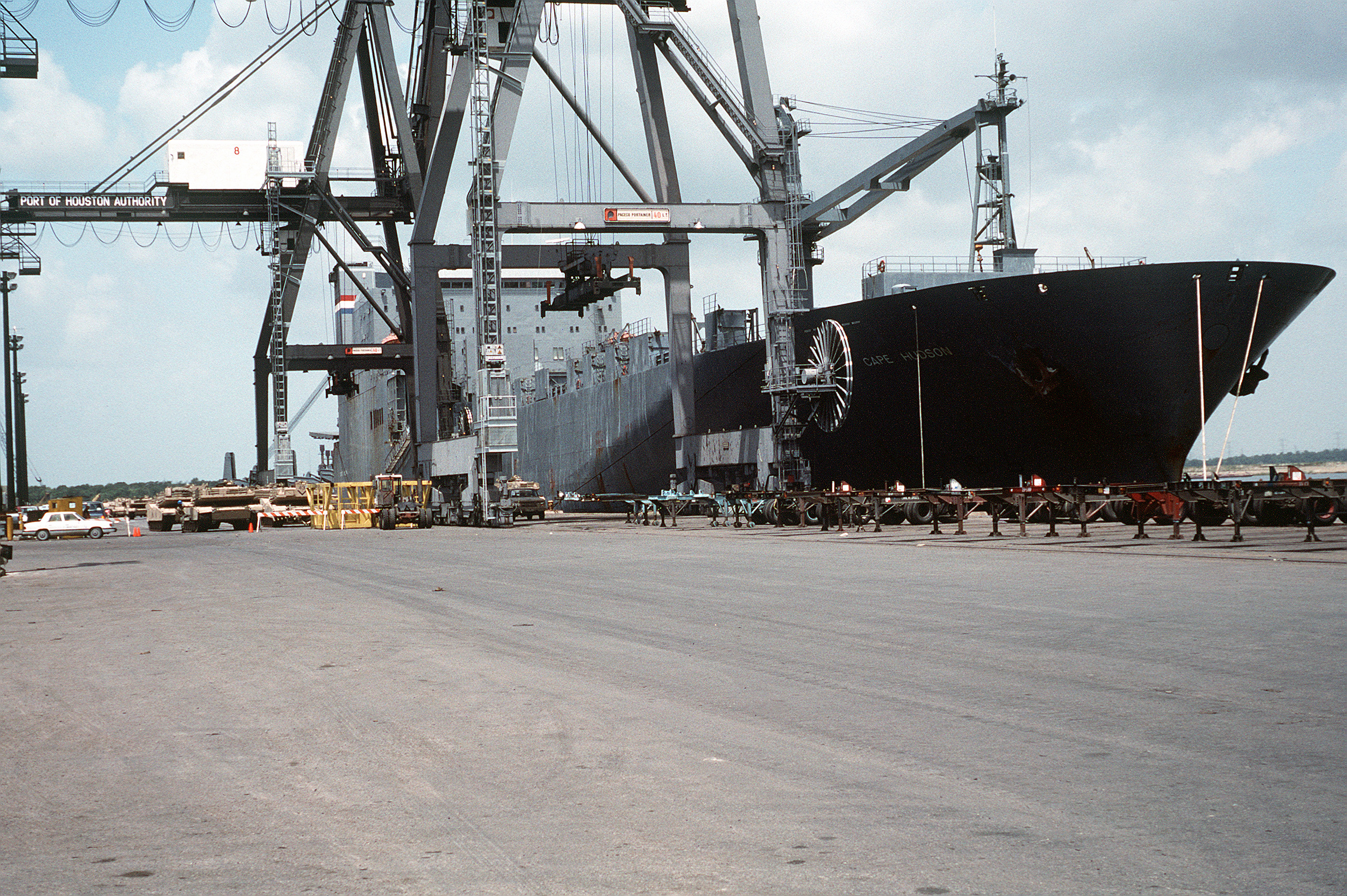
- MV Cape Hudson on 19 July 1991

History

United States
- Name: Cape Hudson
- Namesake: Cape Hudson
- Owner: United States Department of Transportation United States Maritime Administration
- Operator: TOTE Maritime
- Builder: Tangen Verft, Kragerø, Norway
- Launched: 20 September 1978
- Completed: 1979
- Acquired: December 1986
- Commissioned: 15 August 1990
- Renamed: from Barber Taif
- Identification: IMO number: 7704930; MMSI number: 303945000; Callsign: KMJN; Pennant number: T-AKR-5066
- Fate: Still in Govt. Service under MARAD as of 2026
- Status: Laid in San Francisco, in ROS-5 status

General characteristics
- Class & type: Cape H-class roll-on/roll-off
- Tonnage: 39,889 GT
- Displacement: 51,007 long tons
- Length: 749 feet
- Beam: 105 feet inches
- Draft: 35 feet
- Propulsion: Diesel, single propeller
- Speed: 17.4 knots
- Range: Not Disclosed
- Complement: 27 civilian mariners
- Armament: none
- Armor: none
- Aircraft carried: none

MV Cape Hudson (T-AKR-5066) was originally built as a commercial ship in 1979 and sold to the Wilhelmsen Line with the name Barber Taif. She has two sister ships named MV Cape Henry and MV Cape Horn.

== Construction and career ==
It served as a merchant ship until it was purchased by the US Department of Transportation, Maritime Administration in December 1986.

On 15 August 1990, she was reactivated for Operation Desert Storm and Operation Desert Shield until 20 May 1992.

She conducted anchor tests south of Angel Island, San Francisco Bay on 28 July 2007.

From there it was later transferred to the Maritime Administrations Ready reserve fleet and assigned to San Francisco.

As of November 2025 the vessel is still in service under the United States Maritime Administration (MARAD).
