= Walberto =

Walberto is a male given name.

Notable people with the name include:

- Walberto Allende (born 1955), Argentine politician
- Walberto Caicedo (born 1992), Ecuadorian footballer
- Walberto Campos (born 1982), Salvadoran-American poet and writer

== See also ==
- Walbert (disambiguation)
