= Action regulation theory =

Action regulation theory (or Activity regulation theory) was jointly developed by Winfried Hacker. in the 1980s. The Theory serves as a basis for modelling working conditions. As a process model it has its roots in the Soviet psychological activity theory on the one side and on the other side it is based on the T.O.T.E. Model (Test-Operation-Test-Exit) from Miller, Galanter and Pribram. The pursued approach of the Action-Regulation-Theory is the integration of cognitive, behaviourism and social science orientated conceptions. This integration then is used to make explanatory and modelling statements about work conditions. Hacker talks in this context about the holistic work activity, which is an essential criteria for personality development. Through the above described should the partialization of work activity and the Taylorism be overcome. As a cybernetic approach the ground idea of an action/ activity is the regulation. Between the visible work activity and the non visible cognitive processes is a gap, which the Action-Regulation-Theory promise to close. Through a hierarchical-sequential structured model, action steps are supposed to be accurately captured and analysed.

== Underlying Anthropology ==
The individual deals consciously, planning and purposeful with his/her environment, appeals actively on the environment, which appeals back on the individual. Through this interaction, not only does the environment change, but also the individual and his/her personality. The Action-Regulation-Theory emphasizes seeing the individual holistically. On the other hand, accentuates the theory the conscious regulation of activities. With this reflexive aspect regarding the control of activity (T.O.T.E. Model) we have a strong rational layout of conception of man.

== Description of the Action-Regulation Model ==
The ground idea of the Action-Regulation-Theory is the regulation of the activity process. The relevant aspect of the Action-Regulation-Theory is the combination of internal cognitive processes with external activities. Actions or activities are based on goals, planning processes, execution processes, and control processes of which conscious decisions lead the flow of activities towards a certain direction. Goals as an anticipated desired condition are realised through concrete actions. Through a hierarchical-sequential structured model the mentioned process should be visualised and the goal setting and action planning as well as the sequential followed action steps are supposed to be accurately captured and analysed.

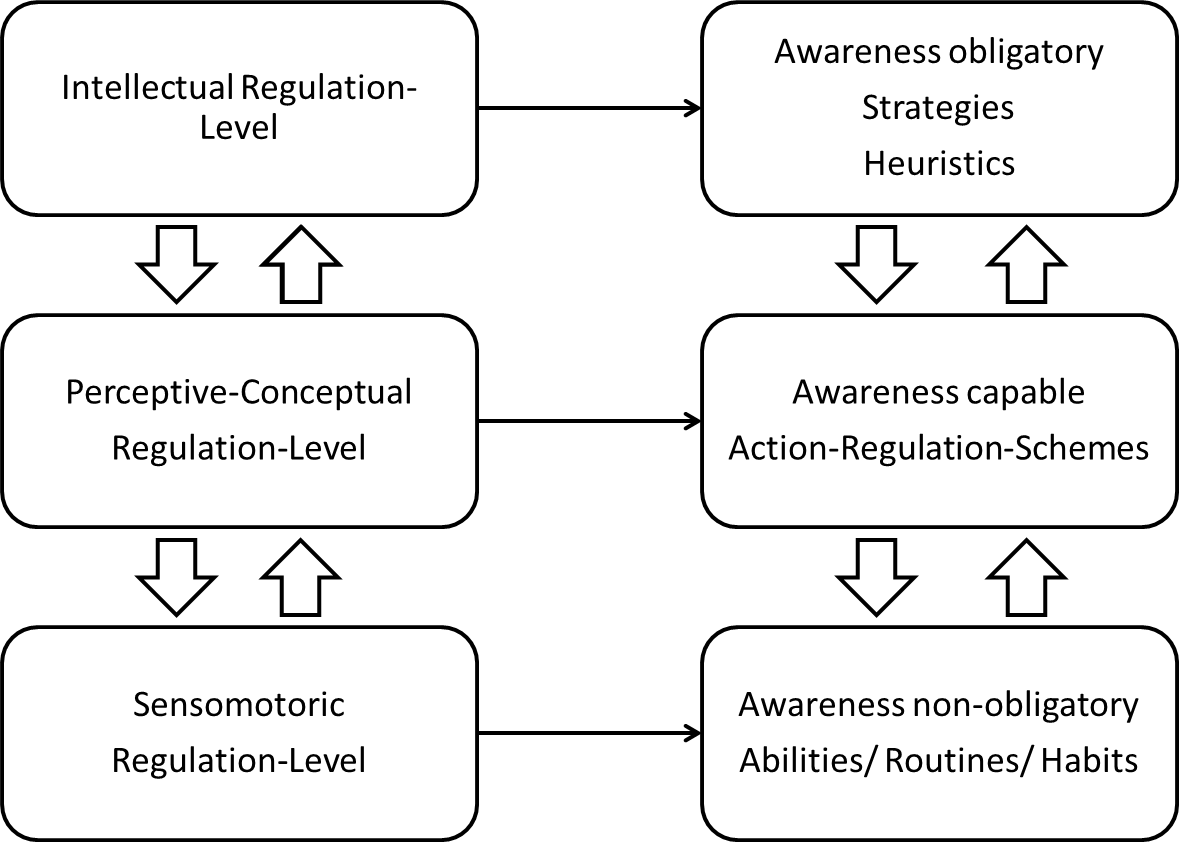
Design of the Action-Regulation-Levels

At the intellectual regulation-level the orientation, goal setting and selection of goals happens as well as the planning of sub-goals and action-plans. This cognitive processes are awareness liable. Below that level the so-called perceptual-conceptual regulatory-level is found, which contains awareness able action plans in relation with judgment and classification processes. Actions are continuously monitored through a feedback-loop to ensure a positive outcome toward the planned goal. Otherwise adjustments will be made. The controlling processes are described through the T.O.T.E. Model by Miller, Galanter and Pribram alternatively through Hackers VVR-Unit (Vergleichs-Veränderungs-Rückkoppelungs-Einheit/Comparison-Modification-Feedback Unit). As the lowest level counts the sensory-motor regulatory level, which does not have its own goal but stands in dependency of the higher levels. This level contains the single operations or activities, which sequentially follow each other. Most actions are non-awareness liable. Sufficient practice and repetition of single actions can lead to automated and so called habitualised actions. The process of socialisation, the internalisation of norms and values, constitutes a relief regarding the goal definition at the intellectual regulatory-level on the one hand and on the other hand habitualisation constitutes a relief from below. Through the named processes intellectual capacity is freed up to concentrate on the progress toward the desired goal and efficacy can be increased. The in both-directing arrows symbolize a continuous control of the own behaviour with the anticipated goal (target-actual comparison).

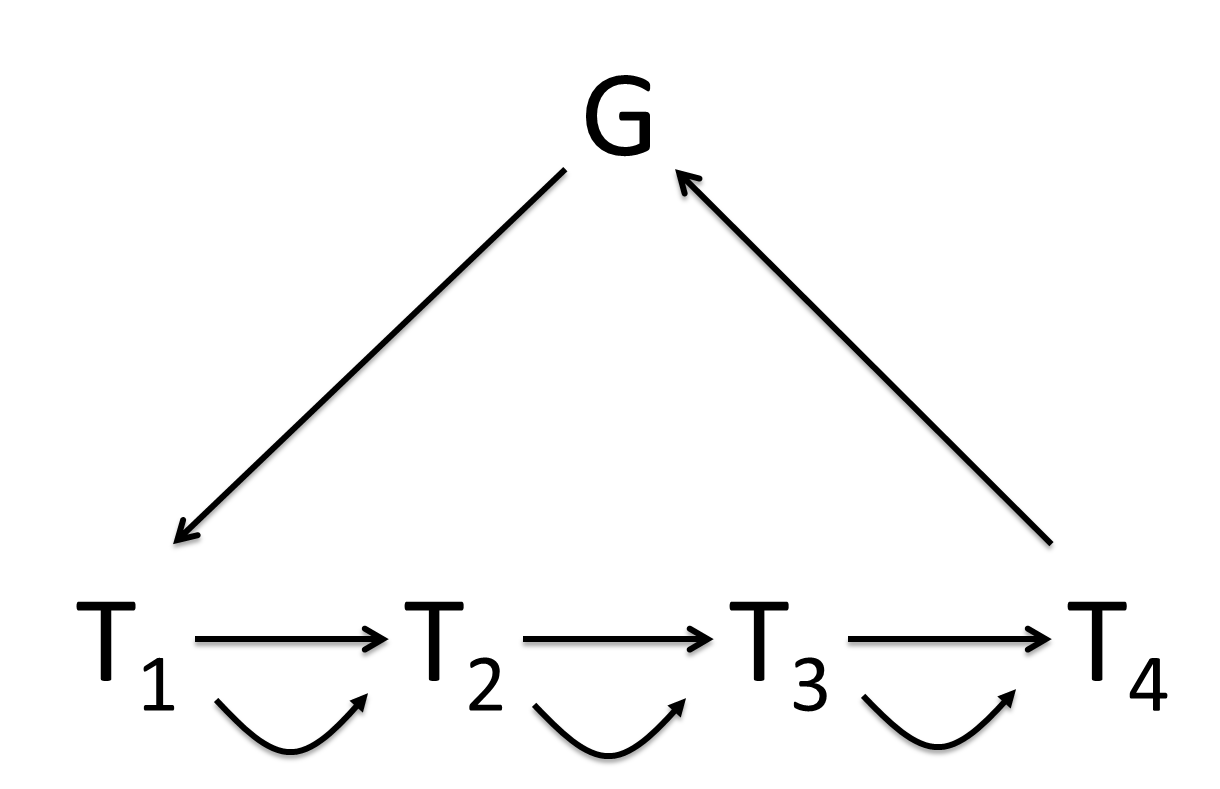
Circular Processes in the Action-Regulation Theory

Regular feedbacks are essential for Hackers model to guarantee purposeful behaviour. He talks about control loops. At the lowest level the first triangle shows the classical circular processes. G is a goal or sub-goal and T1-T4 describe the single operations, transformations or actions which are needed to reach the goal. Although the number of operations shown are just an example. Depending on many aspects, like complexity of the task, the number of operations on each level can vary.

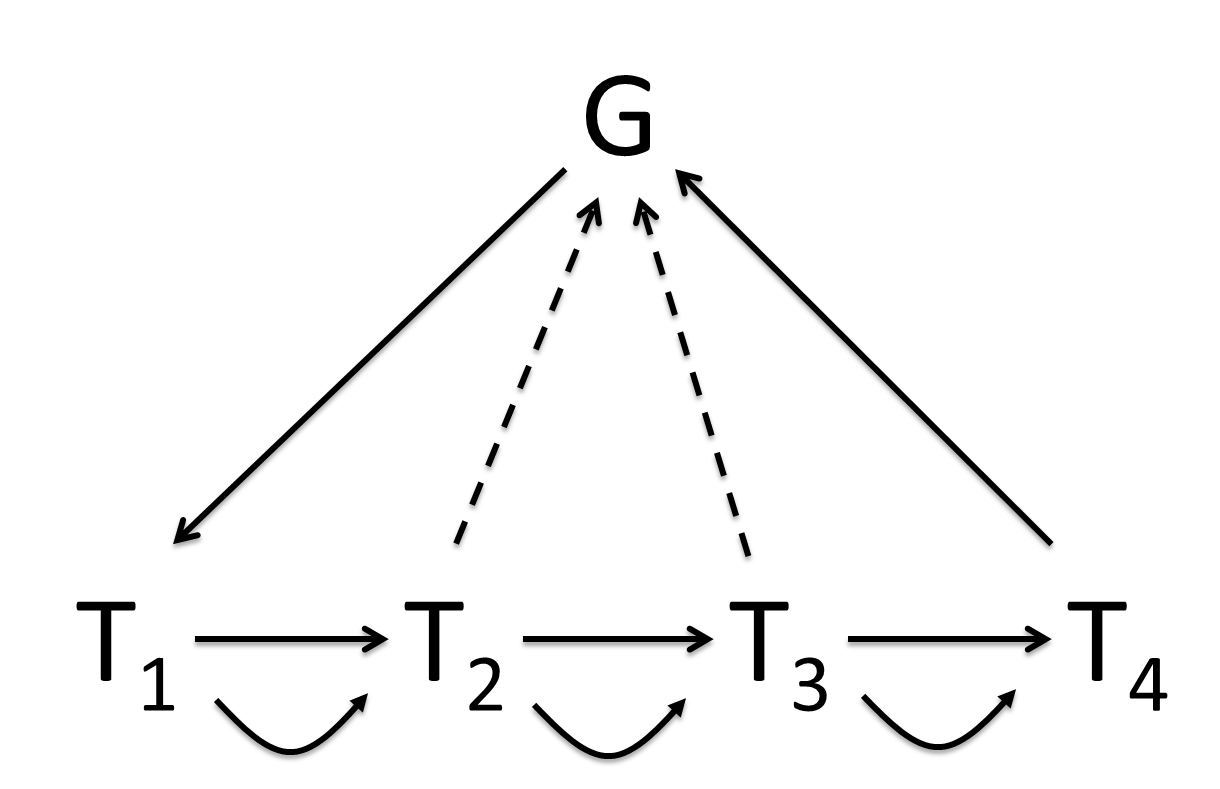
Supplement of the Circular Processes of the Action-Regulation Theory

Triangle two is the supplement to number one by adding additional arrows, which emphasise the constant feedback, which is given during an action. Important to mention is that the generation and performance of activities can be almost simultaneously. Language would be an example of that. This aspect clarifies that in general action plans often are not completely defined in detail.

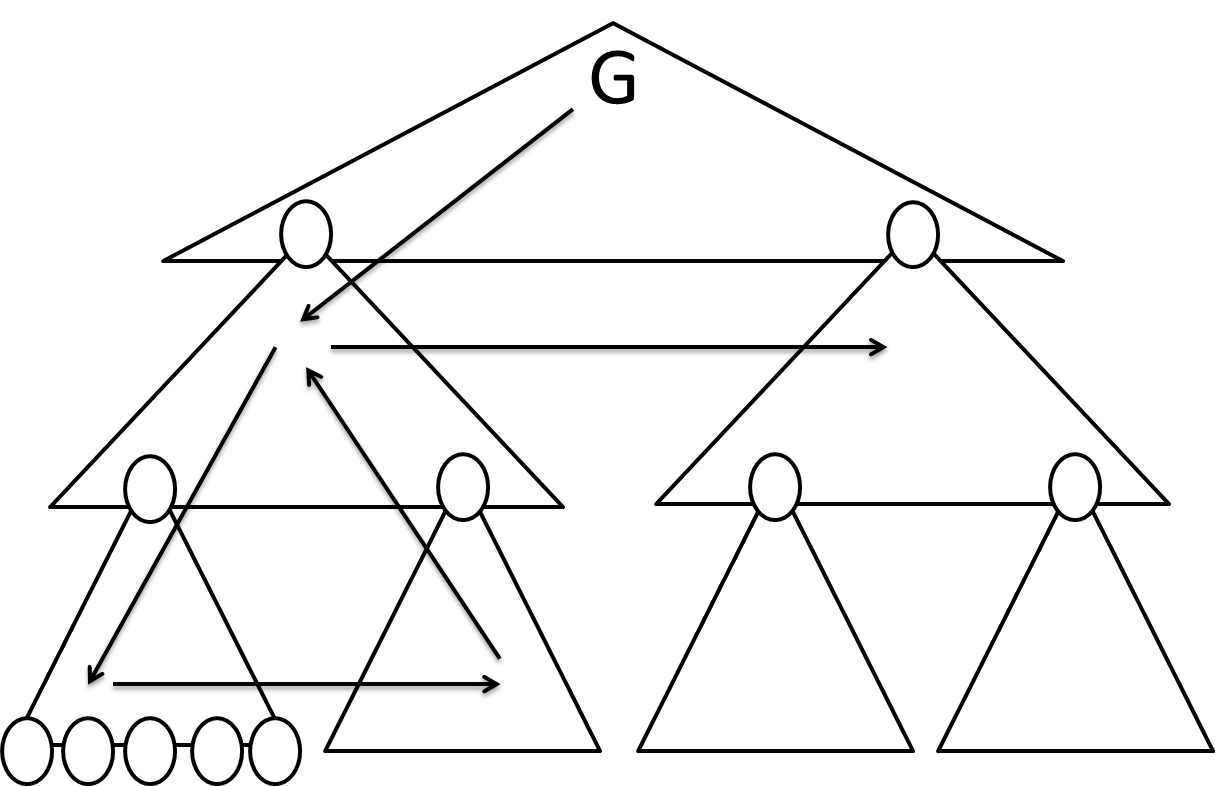
Hierarchical-Sequential Organisation of Human Behaviour / Action

As an illustration take “losing weight” as a super-ordinate goal on the higher regulatory level. That has to be followed down to the lowest sensory-motor regulatory level by an explicit concretion of the required actions. The goal definition requires an increased specification in order to become effective The next triangles below could be “eating healthier” and “doing more exercises”. By looking just at “eating healthier” next sub-goals would be “planning meals”, “writing shopping list”, “go to the shop”, etc. If somewhere in the process an interruption happens a reconsideration of the task will be initiated through the feedback-loops and alternative strategies will put into place. The fact that different people come to different ways of acting is owed the fact that people have e.g. different backgrounds, socialization and knowledge, which all leads to different cognitive processes and so to different outcomes by reaching the same goal.

== Criticism ==
The strongest criticism regarding the Action-Regulation Theory concerns the insufficient involvement of “motivation”.

== See also ==
- Walter Volpert, German psychologist and one of the founders of the action regulation theory (Handlungsregulationstheorie)
