= Shilov boundary =

In functional analysis, the Shilov boundary is the smallest closed subset of the structure space of a commutative Banach algebra where an analog of the maximum modulus principle holds. It is named after its discoverer, Georgii Evgen'evich Shilov.

== Precise definition and existence ==
Let $\mathcal A$ be a commutative Banach algebra and let $\Delta (\mathcal A)$ be its structure space equipped with the relative weak*-topology of the dual ${\mathcal A}^*$. Each element $x\in\mathcal A$ determines its Gelfand transform
$$\widehat{x}(\varphi)=\varphi(x), \qquad \varphi\in\Delta(\mathcal A).$$
A closed subset $F\subseteq\Delta(\mathcal A)$ is a boundary if
$$\max_{\varphi\in\Delta(\mathcal A)} |\widehat{x}(\varphi)| = \max_{\varphi\in F} |\widehat{x}(\varphi)|$$
for every $x\in\mathcal A$.

The set $S = \bigcap\{F:F \text{ is a boundary of } {\mathcal A}\}$ is called the Shilov boundary. It has been proved by Shilov that $S$ is a boundary of ${\mathcal A}$.

Thus one may also say that Shilov boundary is the minimal boundary of $\mathcal A$; that is, the unique set $S \subset \Delta \mathcal A$ which satisfies

1. $S$ is a boundary of $\mathcal A$, and
2. whenever $F$ is a boundary of $\mathcal A$, then $S \subseteq F$.

== Examples ==
If $X$ is a compact Hausdorff space and $\mathcal A=C(X)$, then the Shilov boundary is all of $X$.

Let $\mathbb D=\{z \in \Complex:|z|<1\}$ be the open unit disc in the complex plane and let $A(\mathbb D)$ denote the disc algebra, consisting of the complex-valued functions continuous on $\overline{\mathbb D}$ and holomorphic on $\mathbb D$, with supremum norm and usual algebraic operations. Then $\Delta {\mathcal A} = \bar{\mathbb D}$ and $S=\{|z|=1\}$.

More generally, the Shilov boundary of a polydisc $\mathbb D_1\times \mathbb D_2\times\cdots\times\mathbb D_k$ is the product of the boundaries $\partial\mathbb D_1\times\partial\mathbb D_2\times\cdots\times\partial\mathbb D_k$, and one has the Cauchy integral formula in the polydisc.

== Bounded symmetric domains ==
In the setting of several complex variables and Hermitian symmetric spaces, the Shilov boundary admits a particularly concrete geometric description. Let $D$ be a bounded symmetric domain in its Harish-Chandra realization, and let $G=\operatorname{Aut}(D)^\circ$ be the identity component of its biholomorphism group. Then the Shilov boundary $S$ is the smallest closed subset of the topological boundary $\partial D$ on which every function holomorphic on $D$ and continuous on $\overline D$ attains its maximum modulus.

For bounded symmetric domains this analytic boundary coincides with a distinguished homogeneous boundary orbit: the Shilov boundary is the unique closed $G$-orbit in $\partial D$. Equivalently, if the domain is irreducible then $S$ is a compact homogeneous space of the form $G/Q$, where $Q$ is a suitable maximal parabolic subgroup. In real rank one this Shilov boundary is the whole topological boundary, but in higher rank it is usually a proper subset of $\partial D$.

This description is closely related to the Borel embedding and to the structure theory of Hermitian symmetric spaces. In the language of Jordan triple systems, the Shilov boundary can also be described as the set of maximal tripotents; this point of view is often useful in the study of boundary geometry, transversality, and the Cayley transform.

=== Classical examples ===
For the Cartan type I classical domain

$$\mathcal D_{p,q}=\{Z\in M_{q,p}(\mathbf C): I_p-Z^*Z>0\},$$

the Shilov boundary is

$$S_{p,q}=\{Z\in M_{q,p}(\mathbf C): I_p-Z^*Z=0\}.$$

Under the Borel embedding, this may be identified with the space of maximal totally isotropic $p$-planes for the Hermitian form of signature $(p,q)$; equivalently, it is a homogeneous space for $\mathrm{SU}(p,q)$.

For the Siegel upper half-space (or, equivalently, the bounded symmetric domain associated to $\mathrm{Sp}(2n,\mathbf R)$), the Shilov boundary can be identified with the Lagrangian Grassmannian, the space of Lagrangian subspaces in a real symplectic vector space. In the bounded realization by symmetric matrices, it is also described as the compact manifold of unitary symmetric matrices.

For tube-type bounded symmetric domains, the Shilov boundary has additional structure coming from the corresponding Euclidean Jordan algebra. This extra structure plays an important role in harmonic analysis on the boundary, in the theory of Poisson kernel, and in the study of invariants such as the Maslov index.

=== Tube domains and tube type ===
A bounded symmetric domain is said to be of tube type if it is biholomorphically equivalent to a domain of the form

$$T_\Omega = V + i\Omega,$$

where $V$ is a finite-dimensional real vector space and $\Omega \subset V$ is an open convex cone. For irreducible bounded symmetric domains, this is equivalent to the existence of an underlying Euclidean Jordan algebra structure on $V$; in that case $\Omega$ is the cone of squares in the Jordan algebra, and the tube domain and its bounded realization are related by a generalized Cayley transform.

In the tube-type case, the Shilov boundary has an especially explicit description. If $D$ is realized as the unit ball of the complexification of a Euclidean Jordan algebra $V$, then the Shilov boundary is the set of maximal tripotents. Under the unbounded tube realization $T_\Omega$, the relevant boundary is most naturally described via the compact homogeneous space $G/P$, in which the real vector space $V$ appears as a dense open affine chart. Equivalently, it is a compact homogeneous space for the automorphism group of the domain. For symmetric spaces of rank 1, this is the usual (one point) conformal compactification of $V$.

Tube type is important because bounded symmetric domains of tube type carry additional boundary geometry not present in general. In particular, one has a well-developed notion of transversality on the Shilov boundary, and associated invariants such as the Maslov index play a central role in the geometry of triples of boundary points and in representation theory. This extra structure is also fundamental in harmonic analysis on the boundary, including Poisson transforms and Hardy-type spaces.

An example is the Siegel upper half-space

$$\mathfrak H_n = \{ Z \in \operatorname{Sym}_n(\mathbf C) : \operatorname{Im} Z > 0\},$$

which is a tube domain over the cone of real positive-definite symmetric matrices. Its bounded realization is the symplectic bounded symmetric domain, and its Shilov boundary can be identified with the Lagrangian Grassmannian.

== Uniform algebras ==
The Shilov boundary of a uniform algebras often admits a more explicit description. Let $X$ be a compact Hausdorff space, and let $A\subseteq C(X)$ be a unital subalgebra that is closed in the supremum norm and separates points of $X$. Such an algebra is called a uniform algebra. A closed subset $F\subseteq X$ is called a boundary for $A$ if every function $f\in A$ attains its maximum modulus on $F$, that is,

$$\|f\|_\infty=\max_{x\in F}|f(x)|$$

for all $f\in A$. The Shilov boundary of $A$ is the smallest closed boundary in this sense.

For a uniform algebra, the maximal ideal space of $A$ can be identified with a compact space containing a copy of $X$. In many classical examples the Shilov boundary may be viewed directly as a distinguished closed subset of $X$ itself. For example, if $A=C(X)$, then every point of $X$ is needed, so the Shilov boundary is all of $X$. For the disc algebra $A(\mathbb D)$, the Shilov boundary is the unit circle $\partial\mathbb D$.

For product uniform algebras, the Shilov boundary is the product of the Shilov boundaries of the factors. In particular, the Shilov boundary of the polydisc algebra $A(\mathbb D^n)$ is the torus $\mathbb T^n$, as noted earlier.

The Shilov boundary is closely related to the theory of peak points. A point $x\in X$ is called a peak point for $A$ if there exists a function $f\in A$ such that $f(x)=1$ and $|f(y)|<1$ for all $y\neq x$. Every peak point belongs to the Shilov boundary. In many classical uniform algebras, the closure of the set of peak points coincides with the Shilov boundary.

From this point of view, the Shilov boundary is the smallest closed subset of the underlying compact space that still determines the supremum norm of every function in the algebra. This makes it a natural analogue, for function algebras, of the topological boundary in the maximum modulus principle for holomorphic functions.

== See also ==
- James boundary
- Furstenberg boundary
