= Georgiy Shilov =

Soviet mathematician (1917–1975)

- Born: 3 February 1917; Ivanovo-Voznesensk, Russia
- Died: 3 February 1975 (aged 58); Moscow, Soviet Union
- Education: Moscow State University
- Known for: Gelfand–Shilov space Shilov boundary
- Scientific career
- Fields: Mathematics
- Workplaces: Moscow State University
- Doctoral advisor: Israel Gelfand
- Doctoral students: Mikhail Agranovich; Valentina Borok; Gregory Eskin; Arkadi Nemirovski

Georgi Evgen'evich Shilov (Russian: Гео́ргий Евге́ньевич Ши́лов; 3 February 1917 – 17 January 1975) was a Soviet mathematician and expert in the field of functional analysis, who contributed to the theory of normed rings and generalized functions.

He was born in Ivanovo-Voznesensk. After graduating from Moscow State University in 1938, he served in the army during World War II. He earned a doctorate in physical-mathematical sciences in 1951, also at MSU, and briefly taught at Kyiv University until returning as a professor at MSU in 1954. There, he supervised over 40 graduate students, including Mikhail Agranovich, Valentina Borok, Gregory Eskin, and Arkadi Nemirovski. Shilov often collaborated with colleague Israel Gelfand on research that included generalized functions and partial differential equations.
