= Banach function algebra =

In functional analysis, a Banach function algebra on a compact Hausdorff space X is unital subalgebra, A, of the commutative C*-algebra C(X) of all continuous, complex-valued functions from X, together with a norm on A that makes it a Banach algebra.

A function algebra is said to vanish at a point p if f(p) = 0 for all $f\in A$. A function algebra separates points if for each distinct pair of points $p,q \in X$, there is a function $f\in A$ such that $f(p) \neq f(q)$.

For every $x\in X$ define $\varepsilon_x(f)=f(x),$ for $f\in A$. Then $\varepsilon_x$ is a homomorphism (character) on $A$, non-zero if $A$ does not vanish at $x$.

Theorem: A Banach function algebra is semisimple (that is its Jacobson radical is equal to zero) and each commutative unital, semisimple Banach algebra is isomorphic (via the Gelfand transform) to a Banach function algebra on its character space (the space of algebra homomorphisms from A into the complex numbers given the relative weak* topology).

If the norm on $A$ is the uniform norm (or sup-norm) on $X$, then $A$ is called a uniform algebra. Uniform algebras are an important special case of Banach function algebras.
