= Tanya Khovanova =

Russian American mathematician, educator

- Татьяна Гелиевна Хованова
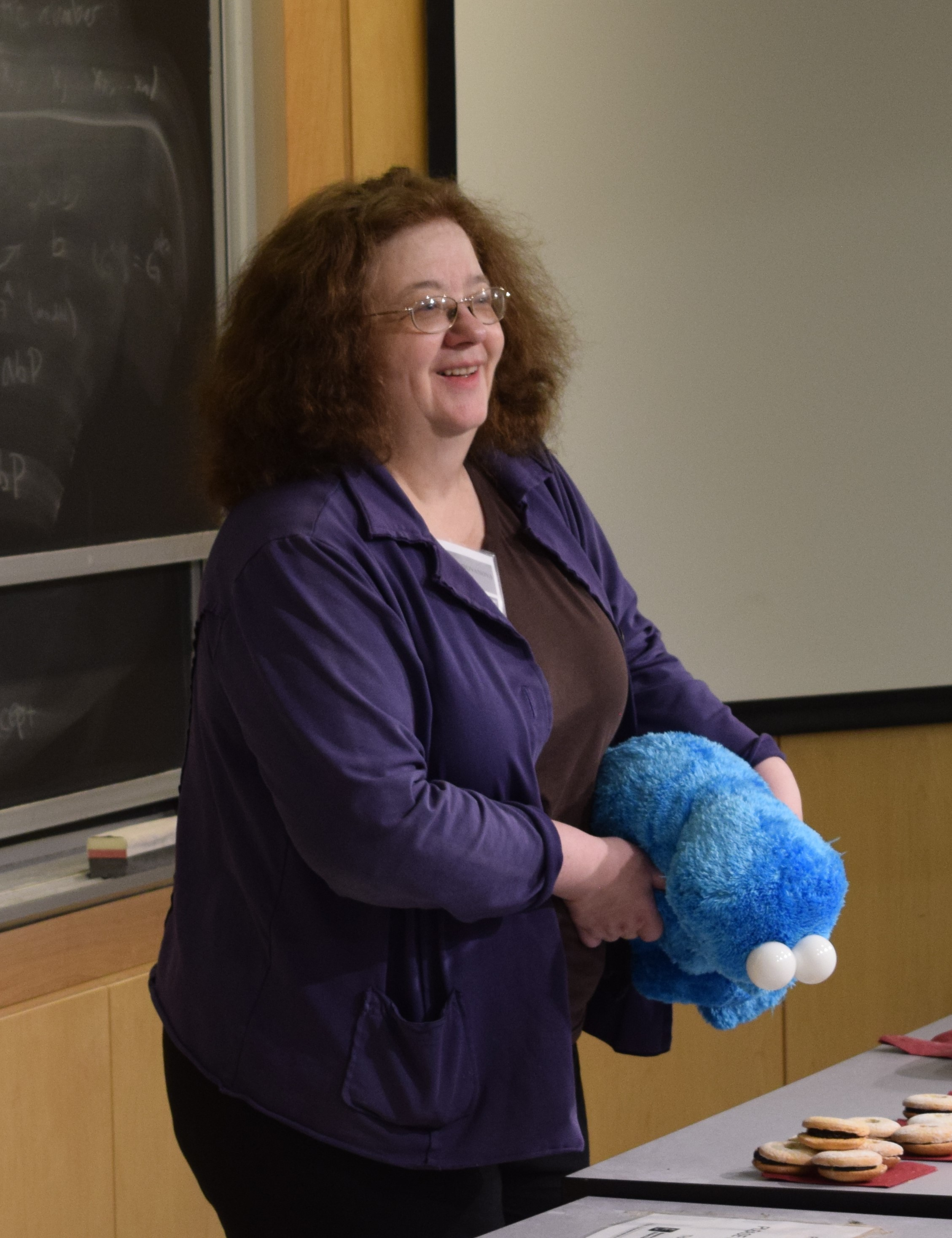
- Other name: Tatyana Hovanova
- Citizenship: United States
- Education: Moscow State University (MS, PhD)
- Children: 2
- Scientific career
- Fields: Combinatorics, Recreational mathematics
- Workplaces: Advanced Math and Science Academy Charter School; Research Science Institute; Massachusetts Institute of Technology
- Doctoral advisor: Israel Gelfand

Tanya Khovanova (Татьяна Гелиевна Хованова, also spelled Tatyana Hovanova; born 25 January 1959) is an American mathematician of Russian origin who became the second female gold medalist at the International Mathematical Olympiads. She is a lecturer in mathematics at the Massachusetts Institute of Technology.

== Education ==
As a high school student, Khovanova became a member of the Soviet team for the International Mathematical Olympiad (IMO). In the summer of 1975, Valery Senderov gave the team a list of difficult mathematical problems used in the entrance exams of Moscow State University to discriminate against Soviet Jews, a topic she later wrote about. Khovanova won the silver medal at the 1975 IMO, and a gold medal at the 1976 Olympiad. Her finish at the 1976 Olympiad was second among all competitors, the highest achievement for female students until 1984, when Karin Gröger from East Germany tied for the first place.

Khovanova graduated with honors from Moscow State University (MSU) with a master's degree in mathematics in 1981. She completed her Ph.D. at MSU in 1988 with Israel Gelfand as her doctoral advisor.

== Career ==
Khovanova left the Soviet Union in 1990, and worked for several years in Israel and the US as a postdoctoral researcher. However, she stopped working as a researcher to raise her children, and then worked in the telecommunications and military contracting industry, before returning to academia as a lecturer at MIT.

Khovanova has been a mathematics competition coach at the Advanced Math and Science Academy Charter School in Marlborough, Massachusetts. In 2010, she helped found the MIT PRIMES program for after school mentoring of local high school students, and she continues to serve as its head mentor. She is also head mentor for mathematics of the Research Science Institute, a summer research program for high school students at MIT.

=== Research ===
In Khovanova's earlier mathematical research, she studied representation theory, the theory of integrable systems, quantum group theory, and superstring theory. Her later work explores combinatorics and recreational mathematics.

=== Online activities ===
In the mid-1990s Khovanova created a website called Number Gossip, about the special properties of individual numbers. In 2007, she created a mathematics blog, centered on mathematical puzzles and problem solving.

== Personal life ==
When Khovanova emigrated to Boston, she did not know how to drive. A friend gave her a copy of The Boston Driver's Handbook which she studied to learn tips before learning years later that the book was intended to be humorous. She has two sons; her first was born in the Soviet Union.

== Recognition ==
An essay about Khovanova, "To Count the Natural Numbers," by Emily Jia, won the 2016 Essay Contest of the Association for Women in Mathematics.

== Selected works ==
Two of Khovanova's papers were included in the annual Best Writing on Mathematics volumes, in 2014 and 2016 respectively.

- Khovanova, Tanya (2019). "On the Mathematics of the Fraternal Birth Order Effect and the Genetics of Homosexuality" (PDF). Archives of Sexual Behavior. 49 (2). Springer Science and Business Media LLC: 551–555. arXiv:1711.09692. doi:10.1007/s10508-019-01573-1. hdl:1721.1/131866.2. ISSN 0004-0002. PMID 31691074. S2CID 37620479.
- Mathematical Puzzles and Curiosities
