= Gelfand–Shilov space =

In mathematics, specifically functional analysis, a Gelfand–Shilov space $S_{\alpha}^{\beta}$, with real parameters $\alpha,\beta\geq 0$, is a space of test functions for the theory of generalized functions, introduced by Israel Gelfand and Georgii Shilov.

The space $S_\alpha^\beta$ is characterized as the space of smooth functions $f:\mathbb R^n\to\mathbb C$ such that there exist constants $A,B,C$ such that, for every pair of multi-indices $i,j$ and every $x\in\mathbb R^n$, the inequality
$$|x^i\partial^jf(x)| \le C A^{|i|}B^{|j|}(i!)^\alpha(j!)^\beta$$
holds. The Fourier transform sends $S_\alpha^\beta$ to $S_\beta^\alpha$.
