= Ultradistribution =

Generalization of a mathematical distribution

In functional analysis, an ultradistribution (also called an ultra-distribution) is a generalized function that extends the concept of a distributions by allowing test functions whose Fourier transforms have compact support. They form an element of the dual space 𝒵′, where 𝒵 is the space of test functions whose Fourier transforms belong to 𝒟, the space of infinitely differentiable functions with compact support.

== See also ==
- Distribution (mathematics)
- Generalized function
