= Beppo-Levi space =

In functional analysis, a branch of mathematics, a Beppo Levi space, named after Beppo Levi, is a certain space of generalized functions.

In the following, D′ is the space of distributions, S′ is the space of tempered distributions in R^{n}, D^{α} the differentiation operator with α a multi-index, and $\widehat{v}$ is the Fourier transform of v.

The Beppo Levi space is

$$\dot{W}^{r,p} = \left \{v \in D' \ : \ D^\alpha v \in L^p \text{ for all }|\alpha|=r\right \}.$$

An alternative definition is as follows: let m ∈ N, s ∈ R such that

$$-m + \tfrac{n}{2} < s < \tfrac{n}{2}$$

and define:

$$\begin{align}
H^s &= \left \{ v \in S' \ : \ \widehat{v} \in L^1_\text{loc}(\mathbf{R}^n), \int_{\mathbf{R}^n} |\xi|^{2s}| \widehat{v} (\xi)|^2 \, d\xi < \infty \right \} \\ [6pt]
X^{m,s} &= \left \{ v \in D' \ : \ \forall \alpha \in \mathbf{N}^n, |\alpha| = m, D^{\alpha} v \in H^s \right \} \\
\end{align}$$

Then X^{m,s} is the Beppo-Levi space.
