= Group index =

Group index may refer to:

- The refractive index of a group velocity in optics
- the index of a subgroup in mathematics
- The Zagreb index, a topological index in graph theory, sometimes called the Zagreb group index.

== See also ==
- Index group
