= Disk algebra =

Set of holomorphic functions

In mathematics, specifically in functional and complex analysis, the disk algebra A(D) (also spelled disc algebra) is the set of holomorphic functions

ƒ : D → $\mathbb{C}$

(where D is the open unit disk in the complex plane $\mathbb{C}$) that extend to a continuous function on the closure of D. That is,

$$A(\mathbf{D}) = H^\infty(\mathbf{D}) \cap C(\overline{\mathbf{D}}),$$

where H^{∞}(D) denotes the Banach space of bounded analytic functions on the unit disc D (i.e. a Hardy space).

When endowed with the pointwise addition (f + g)(z) = f(z) + g(z) and pointwise multiplication (fg)(z) = f(z)g(z), this set becomes an algebra over C, since if f and g belong to the disk algebra, then so do f + g and fg.

Given the uniform norm

$$\|f\| = \sup\big\{|f(z)| \mid z \in \mathbf{D}\big\} = \max\big\{|f(z)| \mid z \in \overline{\mathbf{D}}\big\},$$

by construction, it becomes a uniform algebra and a commutative Banach algebra.

By construction, the disc algebra is a closed subalgebra of the Hardy space H^{∞}. In contrast to the stronger requirement that a continuous extension to the circle exists, it is a lemma of Fatou that a general element of H^{∞} can be radially extended to the circle almost everywhere.
