= Gelfand ring =

Algebraic structure

In mathematics, a Gelfand ring is a ring R with identity such that if I and J are distinct right ideals then there are elements i and j such that iRj = 0, i is not in I, and j is not in J. Mulvey (1979) introduced them as rings for which one could prove a generalization of Gelfand duality, and named them after Israel Gelfand.

In the commutative case, Gelfand rings can also be characterized as the rings such that, for every a and b summing to 1, there exists r and s such that

$$(1+ra)(1+sb) = 0$$.

Moreover, their prime spectrum deformation retracts onto the maximal spectrum.
