= Colombeau algebra =

In mathematics, a Colombeau algebra is an algebra of a certain kind containing the space of Schwartz distributions. While in classical distribution theory a general multiplication of distributions is not possible, Colombeau algebras provide a rigorous framework for this.

Such a multiplication of distributions has long been believed to be impossible because of L. Schwartz' impossibility result, which basically states that there cannot be a differential algebra containing the space of distributions and preserving the product of continuous functions. However, if one only wants to preserve the product of smooth functions instead such a construction becomes possible, as demonstrated first by Colombeau.

As a mathematical tool, Colombeau algebras can be said to combine a treatment of singularities, differentiation and nonlinear operations in one framework, lifting the limitations of distribution theory. These algebras have found numerous applications in the fields of partial differential equations, geophysics, microlocal analysis and general relativity so far.

Colombeau algebras are named after French mathematician Jean François Colombeau.

== Schwartz' impossibility result ==
Attempting to embed the space $\mathcal{D}'(\mathbb{R})$ of distributions on $\mathbb{R}$ into an associative algebra $(A(\mathbb{R}), \circ, +)$, the following requirements seem to be natural:

1. $\mathcal{D}'(\mathbb{R})$ is linearly embedded into $A(\mathbb{R})$ such that the constant function $1$ becomes the unity in $A(\mathbb{R})$,
2. There is a partial derivative operator $\partial$ on $A(\mathbb{R})$ which is linear and satisfies the Leibniz rule,
3. the restriction of $\partial$ to $\mathcal{D}'(\mathbb{R})$ coincides with the usual partial derivative,
4. the restriction of $\circ$ to $C(\mathbb{R}) \times C(\mathbb{R})$ coincides with the pointwise product.

However, L. Schwartz' result implies that these requirements cannot hold simultaneously. The same is true even if, in 4., one replaces $C(\mathbb{R})$ by $C^k(\mathbb{R})$, the space of $k$ times continuously differentiable functions. While this result has often been interpreted as saying that a general multiplication of distributions is not possible, in fact it only states that one cannot unrestrictedly combine differentiation, multiplication of continuous functions and the presence of singular objects like the Dirac delta.

Colombeau algebras are constructed to satisfy conditions 1.–3. and a condition like 4., but with $C(\mathbb{R}) \times C(\mathbb{R})$ replaced by $C^\infty(\mathbb{R}) \times C^\infty(\mathbb{R})$, i.e., they preserve the product of smooth (infinitely differentiable) functions only.

== Basic idea ==
The Colombeau Algebra is defined as the quotient algebra

$$C^\infty_M(\mathbb{R}^n)/C^\infty_N(\mathbb{R}^n).$$

Here the algebra of moderate functions $C^\infty_M(\mathbb{R}^n)$ on $\mathbb{R}^n$ is the algebra of families of smooth regularisations (f_{ε})

$${f:} \mathbb{R}_+ \to C^\infty(\mathbb{R}^n)$$

of smooth functions on $\mathbb{R}^n$ (where R_{+} = (0,∞) is the "regularization" parameter ε), such that for all compact subsets K of $\mathbb{R}^n$ and all multiindices α, there is an N > 0 such that

$$\sup_{x\in K}\left|\frac{\partial^{|\alpha|}}{(\partial x_1)^{\alpha_1}\cdots(\partial x_n)^{\alpha_n}}f_\varepsilon(x)\right| = O(\varepsilon^{-N})\qquad(\varepsilon\to 0).$$

The ideal $C^\infty_N(\mathbb{R}^n)$ of negligible functions is defined in the same way but with the partial derivatives instead bounded by O(ε^{+N}) for all N > 0.

== Embedding of distributions ==
The space(s) of Schwartz distributions can be embedded into the simplified algebra by (component-wise) convolution with any element of the algebra having as representative a δ-net, i.e. a family of smooth functions $\varphi_\varepsilon$ such that $\varphi_\varepsilon\to\delta$ in D' as ε → 0.

This embedding is non-canonical, because it depends on the choice of the δ-net. However, there are versions of Colombeau algebras (so called full algebras) which allow for canonical embeddings of distributions. A well known full version is obtained by adding the mollifiers as second indexing set.

== See also ==
- Generalized function
