= Multiple orthogonal polynomials =

In mathematics, the multiple orthogonal polynomials (MOPs) are orthogonal polynomials in one variable that are orthogonal with respect to a finite family of measures. The polynomials are divided into two classes named type 1 and type 2.

In the literature, MOPs are also called $d$-orthogonal polynomials, Hermite-Padé polynomials or polyorthogonal polynomials. MOPs should not be confused with multivariate orthogonal polynomials.

== Multiple orthogonal polynomials ==
Consider a multiindex $\vec{n}=(n_1,\dots,n_r)\in \mathbb{N}^r$ and $r$ positive measures $\mu_1,\dots,\mu_r$ over the reals. As usual $|\vec{n}|:=n_1+n_2+\cdots + n_r$.

=== MOP of type 1 ===
Polynomials $A_{\vec{n},j}$ for $j=1,2,\dots,r$ are of type 1 if the $j$-th polynomial $A_{\vec{n},j}$ has at most degree $n_j-1$ such that

$$\sum\limits_{j=1}^r\int_{\R}x^kA_{\vec{n},j}d\mu_j(x)=0,\qquad k=0,1,2,\dots,|\vec{n}|-2,$$

and

$\sum\limits_{j=1}^r\int_{\R}x^{|\vec{n}|-1}A_{\vec{n},j}d\mu_j(x)=1.$

==== Explanation ====
This defines a system of $|\vec{n}|$ equations for the $|\vec{n}|$ coefficients of the polynomials $A_{\vec{n},1},A_{\vec{n},2},\dots,A_{\vec{n},r}$.

=== MOP of type 2 ===
A monic polynomial $P_{\vec{n}}(x)$ is of type 2 if it has degree $|\vec{n}|$ such that

$\int_{\R}P_{\vec{n}}(x)x^k d\mu_j(x)=0,\qquad k=0,1,2,\dots,n_j-1,\qquad j=1,\dots,r.$

==== Explanation ====
If we write $j=1,\dots,r$ out, we get the following definition

$$\int_{\R}P_{\vec{n}}(x)x^k d\mu_1(x)=0,\qquad k=0,1,2,\dots,n_1-1$$
$$\int_{\R}P_{\vec{n}}(x)x^k d\mu_2(x)=0,\qquad k=0,1,2,\dots,n_2-1$$
$$\vdots$$
$$\int_{\R}P_{\vec{n}}(x)x^k d\mu_r(x)=0,\qquad k=0,1,2,\dots,n_r-1$$

== Literature ==
- Ismail, Mourad E. H. (2005). Classical and Quantum Orthogonal Polynomials in One Variable. Cambridge University Press. pp. 607–647. ISBN 9781107325982.
- López-Lagomasino, G. (2021). An Introduction to Multiple Orthogonal Polynomials and Hermite-Padé Approximation. In: Marcellán, F., Huertas, E.J. (eds) Orthogonal Polynomials: Current Trends and Applications. SEMA SIMAI Springer Series, vol 22. Springer, Cham. https://doi.org/10.1007/978-3-030-56190-1_9
