= Topological divisor of zero =

In mathematics, an element $z$ of a Banach algebra $A$ is called a topological divisor of zero if there exists a sequence $x_1,x_2,x_3,...$ of elements of $A$ such that

1. The sequence $zx_n$ converges to the zero element, but
2. The sequence $x_n$ does not converge to the zero element.

If such a sequence exists, then one may assume that $\left \Vert \ x_n \right \| = 1$ for all $n$.

If $A$ is not commutative, then $z$ is called a "left" topological divisor of zero, and one may define "right" topological divisors of zero similarly.

== Examples ==
- If $A$ has a unit element, then the invertible elements of $A$ form an open subset of $A$, while the non-invertible elements are the complementary closed subset. Any point on the boundary between these two sets is both a left and right topological divisor of zero.
- In particular, any quasinilpotent element is a topological divisor of zero (e.g. the Volterra operator).
- An operator on a Banach space $X$, which is injective, not surjective, but whose image is dense in $X$, is a left topological divisor of zero.

== Generalization ==
The notion of a topological divisor of zero may be generalized to any topological algebra. If the algebra in question is not first-countable, one must substitute nets for the sequences used in the definition.
