= Maslov index =

Maslov index is an integer-valued invariant in symplectic geometry, microlocal analysis, and semiclassical analysis. It is associated most classically with a loop or path of Lagrangian subspaces in a symplectic vector space, and measures how that path meets a distinguished singular hypersurface known as the Maslov cycle. Informally, it records the winding of a family of Lagrangian subspaces relative to the locus of subspaces that fail to be transverse to a chosen reference Lagrangian.

The Maslov index was introduced in the context of asymptotic methods in mathematical physics and later reformulated in topological and geometric terms. It plays an important role in the theory of Fourier integral operators, geometric quantization, Hamiltonian systems, spectral theory, and Floer homology.

== Overview ==
Let $(V,\omega)$ be a finite-dimensional symplectic vector space, and let $\Lambda(V)$ denote its Lagrangian Grassmannian, the manifold of all Lagrangian subspaces of $V$. The topology of $\Lambda(V)$ is nontrivial: its fundamental group is isomorphic to $\mathbf{Z}$. The Maslov index may be viewed as the corresponding homotopy invariant, assigning an integer to a loop in the Lagrangian Grassmannian.

Equivalently, after fixing a reference Lagrangian subspace $L_0$, one considers the Maslov cycle

$$\Sigma(L_0)=\{L\in \Lambda(V)\mid L\cap L_0\neq 0\}.$$

This is a singular hypersurface in $\Lambda(V)$. For a generic path of Lagrangian subspaces, the Maslov index counts with signs the intersections of the path with $\Sigma(L_0)$.

== Definition ==
=== As a homotopy invariant ===
If $\gamma\colon S^1\to \Lambda(V)$ is a loop in the Lagrangian Grassmannian, its Maslov index $\mu(\gamma)$ is the integer corresponding to the homotopy class of $\gamma$ under the isomorphism

$\pi_1(\Lambda(V))\cong \mathbf{Z}.$

This definition makes the Maslov index a topological invariant of loops of Lagrangian subspaces.

=== Via the Maslov cycle ===
Fix a Lagrangian subspace $L_0\subseteq V$. For a sufficiently generic path $\gamma\colon [a,b]\to \Lambda(V)$ whose endpoints are transverse to $L_0$, the Maslov index $\mu_{L_0}(\gamma)$ is defined as the signed intersection number of $\gamma$ with the Maslov cycle $\Sigma(L_0)$.

At a transverse crossing time $t_*$ for which $\gamma(t_*)\cap L_0\neq 0$, the sign is determined by the crossing form, a quadratic form on the intersection $\gamma(t_*)\cap L_0$. The total Maslov index is the sum of the inertial index of these crossing forms over all crossings.

=== Via the Kashiwara form ===
Given a cycle of Lagrangian subspaces $A_1\to A_2\dots\to A_k\to A_1$, the Kashiwara form is the quadratic form on $A_1\oplus A_2\oplus\cdots\oplus A_k$
$$\kappa(a_1,a_2,\dots,a_k) = \omega(a_1,a_2) + \omega(a_2,a_3)+\cdots+\omega(a_{k-1},a_k) + \omega(a_k,a_1).$$
The Maslov index is the inertial index of the form $\kappa$. When the subspaces are mutually transverse, the cycle $A_1,\dots,A_k,A_1$ can be realized as a polygon in $\Lambda_n$, such that $A_{k+1}$ is the graph of a symmetric transformation $S:A_k\to A_{k-1}$,
$$A_{k+1} = \{x + Sx \mid x \in A_k\}.$$
Then the edge $A_kA_{k+1}$ in the polygon is parameterized by $u\in[0,1]$, $\{x + uSx\mid x\in A_k\}$.

=== For paths of symplectic matrices ===
The Maslov index can also be attached to a path in the symplectic group $\mathrm{Sp}(2n,\mathbf{R})$. If $\Phi_t$ is a path of symplectic matrices and $L$ is a fixed Lagrangian subspace, then the path $\Phi_t(L)$ in the Lagrangian Grassmannian has a Maslov index. In this form the invariant is closely related to the Conley-Zehnder index and to stability questions for periodic orbits of Hamiltonian systems.

== Basic properties ==
The Maslov index satisfies several formal properties.

- Homotopy invariance: it is unchanged under homotopies through paths with fixed admissible endpoints.
- Additivity under concatenation: if two paths can be concatenated, the Maslov index of the concatenated path is the sum of the indices.
- Naturality: symplectic automorphisms preserve the Maslov index.
- Direct sum property: for product symplectic spaces, the Maslov index is additive under direct sums of paths.
- Normalization: a generator of $\pi_1(\Lambda(V))$ has Maslov index $1$ or $2$, depending on conventions.

Different authors adopt slightly different normalizations, especially when comparing the Maslov index of Lagrangian paths, the Maslov class, and the Conley-Zehnder index.

== Low-dimensional example ==
In the standard symplectic plane $(\mathbf{R}^2,\omega=dx\wedge dy)$, every one-dimensional subspace is Lagrangian, so the Lagrangian Grassmannian can be identified with the real projective line $\mathbf{RP}^1$. A path of Lagrangian lines is therefore a path of unoriented lines through the origin.

Fixing the horizontal axis as reference, the Maslov cycle consists of the single point represented by that axis. The Maslov index of a generic loop counts how many times, with sign and appropriate normalization, the moving line passes through the horizontal direction. In this dimension the Maslov index is closely related to the winding number.

== Maslov class ==
There is a universal cohomology class

$$\mu \in H^1(\Lambda(V);\mathbf{Z}),$$

called the Maslov class. The Maslov index of a loop is obtained by pairing this class with the homology class of the loop.

If $L$ is a Lagrangian submanifold of a symplectic manifold $(M,\omega)$, the Gauss map of $L$ takes values in an appropriate Lagrangian Grassmannian bundle. Pulling back the universal Maslov class gives a cohomology class in $H^1(L;\mathbf{Z})$, also called the Maslov class of the Lagrangian submanifold. Its vanishing is an important condition in symplectic topology and Floer theory.

== Applications ==
=== Geometric optics and caustics ===
In geometric optics, the eikonal equation determines a Lagrangian submanifold $\Lambda\subset T^*X$. Away from caustics, the projection $\pi|_\Lambda:\Lambda\to X$ is locally a diffeomorphism, so $\Lambda$ can be written locally as the graph of $dS$, and one obtains a WKB solution of the form
$$u_h(x)\sim a(x)e^{iS(x)/h}.$$
A caustic occurs when this projection ceases to be regular, so that the single-phase description breaks down.

In ray coordinates, the amplitude contains a Jacobian factor
$$a(x)\propto \left|\det\frac{\partial x}{\partial \alpha}\right|^{-1/2},$$
which becomes singular at a caustic. Near a generic fold caustic, the local model is given by the Airy function. Its oscillatory asymptotics,
$$\operatorname{Ai}(-z)\sim \frac{1}{\sqrt{\pi}\,z^{1/4}}
\sin\!\left(\frac23 z^{3/2}+\frac{\pi}{4}\right),$$
display the phase shift that is encoded globally by the Maslov index.

=== Fourier integral operators ===
The Maslov index also appears in the theory of Fourier integral operators. If an oscillatory integral is written using two different phase functions that parametrize the same Lagrangian submanifold, the method of stationary phase relates the two expressions. The transformation law contains the factor
$$|\det \partial^2_{\theta\theta}\Phi|^{-1/2}
e^{\,i\pi\,\operatorname{sgn}(\partial^2_{\theta\theta}\Phi)/4},$$
so the signature of the Hessian contributes a phase defined modulo integer multiples of $\pi/2$.

Globally, these local phase ambiguities are encoded by the Keller–Maslov bundle, and the principal symbol of a Fourier integral operator is naturally a half-density twisted by that bundle.

=== Semiclassical analysis ===
The Maslov index appears in WKB theory and related semiclassical approximations as a phase correction. When an oscillatory solution passes through a caustic, the phase jumps by a multiple of $\pi/2$. This correction is encoded by the Maslov index.

For this reason the invariant is fundamental in the asymptotic study of wave propagation, Fourier integral operators, and quantization conditions in classical and quantum mechanics.

=== Microlocal analysis ===
In the theory of Fourier integral operators, phase functions may be replaced under changes of coordinates or generating functions. The resulting phase ambiguity is controlled by the Maslov index, which governs the correct choice of half-density and phase factor.

=== Symplectic topology ===
In Floer homology and the theory of pseudoholomorphic curves, Maslov-type indices determine gradings, expected dimensions of moduli spaces, and transversality formulas. For a Lagrangian submanifold, the Maslov class enters the definition of monotonicity and the construction of Lagrangian Floer homology.

=== Hamiltonian dynamics ===
For periodic orbits and linearized Hamiltonian flows, Maslov-type indices measure spectral flow and stability. In this setting they are closely related to the Morse index, the Conley-Zehnder index, and the theory of symplectic paths.

== Generalizations ==
Several related invariants are often described as Maslov indices or Maslov-type indices.

- The Conley–Zehnder index for paths of symplectic matrices.
- The Robbin–Salamon index, which extends the Maslov index to more general symplectic paths.
- The Maslov class of a Lagrangian submanifold in a symplectic manifold.

These constructions agree in overlapping settings but are adapted to different geometric and analytic problems.

=== Infinite-dimensional generalizations ===
The Maslov index also has infinite-dimensional analogues, especially for paths in the Fredholm–Lagrangian Grassmannian of a symplectic Hilbert space. An early formulation in this direction was given by Nobukazu Otsuki and Kenro Furutani for Lagrangian intersections in real Hilbert spaces, and a widely cited functional-analytic definition for continuous curves in the Fredholm–Lagrangian Grassmannian was developed by Bernhelm Booss-Bavnbek and Kenro Furutani. In this setting the Maslov index is closely related to spectral flow and to index theory for families of self-adjoint Fredholm operators. A standard review is Furutani's article on the Fredholm–Lagrangian Grassmannian.

== History ==
The index is named after the Soviet mathematician and physicist Viktor Pavlovich Maslov, who introduced it in the study of asymptotic solutions of differential equations. It was later given a more explicitly topological interpretation by Vladimir Arnold, who related it to the topology of the Lagrangian Grassmannian and its universal cohomology class.

Subsequent work connected the Maslov index with Fourier integral operators, spectral theory, and modern symplectic topology.
