= Limit of distributions =

In mathematics, specifically in the theory of generalized functions, the limit of a sequence of distributions is the distribution that sequence approaches. The distance, suitably quantified, to the limiting distribution can be made arbitrarily small by selecting a distribution sufficiently far along the sequence. This notion generalizes a limit of a sequence of functions; a limit as a distribution may exist when a limit of functions does not.

The notion is a part of distributional calculus, a generalized form of calculus that is based on the notion of distributions, as opposed to classical calculus, which is based on the narrower concept of functions.

== Definition ==
Given a sequence of distributions $f_i$, its limit $f$ is the distribution given by

$$f[\varphi] = \lim_{i \to \infty} f_i[\varphi]$$

for each test function $\varphi$, provided that distribution exists. The existence of the limit $f$ means that (1) for each $\varphi$, the limit of the sequence of numbers $f_i[\varphi]$ exists and that (2) the linear functional $f$ defined by the above formula is continuous with respect to the topology on the space of test functions.

More generally, as with functions, one can also consider a limit of a family of distributions.

== Examples ==
A distributional limit may still exist when the classical limit does not. Consider, for example, the function:

$$f_t(x) = {t \over 1 + t^2 x^2}$$

Since, by integration by parts,

$$\langle f_t, \phi \rangle = -\int_{-\infty}^0 \arctan(tx) \phi'(x) \, dx - \int_0^\infty \arctan(tx) \phi'(x) \, dx,$$

we have: $\displaystyle \lim_{t \to \infty} \langle f_t, \phi \rangle = \langle \pi \delta_0, \phi \rangle$. That is, the limit of $f_t$ as $t \to \infty$ is $\pi \delta_0$.

Let $f(x+i0)$ denote the distributional limit of $f(x+iy)$ as $y \to 0^+$, if it exists. The distribution $f(x-i0)$ is defined similarly.

One has

$$(x - i 0)^{-1} - (x + i 0)^{-1} = 2 \pi i \delta_0.$$

Let $\Gamma_N = [-N-1/2, N+1/2]^2$ be the rectangle with positive orientation, with an integer N. By the residue formula,

$$I_N \overset{\mathrm{def}} = \int_{\Gamma_N} \widehat{\phi}(z) \pi \cot(\pi z) \, dz = {2 \pi i} \sum_{-N}^N  \widehat{\phi}(n).$$

On the other hand,

$$\begin{align} \int_{-R}^R  \widehat{\phi}(\xi) \pi \operatorname{cot}(\pi \xi) \, d &= \int_{-R}^R \int_0^\infty \phi(x)e^{-2 \pi I x \xi} \, dx \, d\xi + \int_{-R}^R \int_{-\infty}^0 \phi(x)e^{-2 \pi I x \xi} \, dx \, d\xi \\
&= \langle \phi, \cot(\cdot - i0) - \cot(\cdot - i0) \rangle
\end{align}$$

== See also ==
- Distribution (number theory)
