= Gregory Eskin =

Russian-Israeli-American mathematician

Gregory I. Eskin
- גרגורי אסקין
- Born: 5 December 1936 (age 89); Kiev, Ukrainian SSR
- Education: Moscow State University
- Spouse: Marina Eskin
- Children: Alex; Eleazar; Ascia
- Scientific career
- Fields: Mathematics
- Workplaces: University of California, Los Angeles
- Doctoral advisor: Georgiy Shilov

Gregory Eskin (Hebrew: גרגורי אסקין, Russian: Григорий Ильич Эскин; born 5 December 1936) is a Russian-Israeli-American mathematician, specializing in partial differential equations.

Eskin received in 1963 his Ph.D. (Russian candidate's degree) from Moscow State University with thesis advisor Georgiy Shilov. In 1974 Eskin immigrated with his family to Israel and became a professor at the Hebrew University of Jerusalem. In 1983 he was an invited speaker at the International Congress of Mathematicians at Warsaw. In 1982 he with his family emigrated from Israel to the USA and he became a professor at UCLA. He was elected a Fellow of the American Mathematical Society in 2014.

He is married to Marina Eskin, also a mathematician. Their son Alex is a professor of mathematics at the University of Chicago, their other son Eleazar is a professor of computer science and human genetics at UCLA, and their daughter Ascia is a researcher in the Department of Human Genetics, David Geffen UCLA School of Medicine.

== Selected publications ==
=== Articles ===
- with Marko Iosifovich Vishik: Vishik, M. I.; Eskin, G. I. (1965). "Equations in convolutions in a bounded region". Russian Mathematical Surveys. 20 (3): 85–151. Bibcode:1965RuMaS..20...85V. doi:10.1070/RM1965v020n03ABEH001184.
- Eskin, Gregory (1977). "Parametrix and propagation of singularities for the interior mixed hyperbolic problem". Journal d'Analyse Mathématique. 32 (1): 17–62. doi:10.1007/BF02803574. S2CID 121083501.
- Eskin, G. (2006). "A new approach to hyperbolic inverse problems". Inverse Problems. 22 (3): 815–831. arXiv:math/0505452. Bibcode:2006InvPr..22..815E. doi:10.1088/0266-5611/22/3/005. S2CID 7160768.
- Eskin, Gregory (2015). "Aharonov-Bohm effect revisited". Rev. Math. Phys. 27 (2): 1530001–113. arXiv:1504.04784. Bibcode:2015RvMaP..2730001E. doi:10.1142/S0129055X15300010. S2CID 119589778.

=== Books ===
- Краевые задачи для эллиптических псевдодифференциальных уравнений (Boundary problems for elliptic pseudodifferential equations) М.: Наука, (Moscow, Nauka) 1973. — 232 p.
- Boundary Value Problems for Elliptic Pseudodifferential Equations. American Mathematical Society, 2008. — 375 p.
- Lectures on Linear Partial Differential Equations. American Mathematical Society, 2011. — 410 p.
