= Distribution (number theory) =

In algebra and number theory, a distribution is a function on a system of finite sets into an abelian group which is analogous to an integral: it is thus the algebraic analogue of a distribution in the sense of generalised function.

The original examples of distributions occur, unnamed, as functions φ on $\mathbb{Q}/\mathbb{Z}$ satisfying

$$\sum_{r=0}^{N-1} \phi\!\left(x + \frac{r}{N}\right) = \phi(Nx) .$$

Such distributions are called ordinary distributions. They also occur in p-adic integration theory in Iwasawa theory.

Let ... → X_{n+1} → X_{n} → ... be a projective system of finite sets with surjections, indexed by $\mathbb{N}$, and let X be their projective limit. We give each X_{n} the discrete topology, so that X is compact. Let φ = (φ_{n}) be a family of functions on X_{n} taking values in an abelian group V and compatible with the projective system:

$$w(m,n) \sum_{y \mapsto x} \phi(y) = \phi(x)$$

for some weight function w. The family φ is then a distribution on the projective system X.

A function f on X is "locally constant", or a "step function", if it factors through some X_{n}. We can define an integral of a step function against φ as

$$\int f \, d\phi = \sum_{x \in X_n} f(x) \phi_n(x) .$$

The definition extends to more general projective systems, such as those indexed by the positive integers ordered by divisibility. As an important special case, consider the projective system Z/n‌Z indexed by positive integers ordered by divisibility. We identify this with the system (1/n)Z/Z with limit Q/Z.

For x in R, we let ⟨x⟩ denote the fractional part of x normalised to 0 ≤ ⟨x⟩ < 1, and let {x} denote the fractional part normalised to 0 < {x} ≤ 1.

== Examples ==
=== Hurwitz zeta function ===
The multiplication theorem for the Hurwitz zeta function

$$\zeta(s,a) = \sum_{n=0}^\infty (n+a)^{-s}$$

gives a distribution relation

$$\sum_{p=0}^{q-1}\zeta(s,a+p/q)=q^s\,\zeta(s,qa) .$$

Hence for given s, the map $t \mapsto \zeta(s,\{t\})$ is a distribution on $\mathbb{Q}/\mathbb{Z}$.

=== Bernoulli distribution ===
Recall that the Bernoulli polynomials B_{n} are defined by

$$B_n(x) = \sum_{k=0}^n {n \choose n-k} b_k x^{n-k} \ ,$$

for n ≥ 0, where b_{k} are the Bernoulli numbers, with generating function

$$\frac{t e^{xt}}{e^t-1} = \sum_{n=0}^\infty B_n(x) \frac{t^n}{n!} .$$

They satisfy the distribution relation

$$B_k(x) = n^{k-1} \sum_{a=0}^{n-1} b_k\left({\frac{x+a}{n}}\right)\! .$$

Thus the map

$$\phi_n : \frac{1}{n}\mathbb{Z}/\mathbb{Z} \rightarrow \mathbb{Q}$$

defined by

$$\phi_n : x \mapsto n^{k-1} B_k(\langle x \rangle)$$

is a distribution.

=== Cyclotomic units ===
The cyclotomic units satisfy distribution relations. Let a be an element of $\mathbb{Q}/\mathbb{Z}$ prime to p and let g_{a} denote exp(2πia)−1. Then we have for a≠0 that

$$\prod_{p b=a} g_b = g_a .$$

== Universal distribution ==
One considers the distributions on Z with values in some abelian group V and seek the "universal" or most general distribution possible.

== Stickelberger distributions ==
Let h be an ordinary distribution on $\mathbb{Q}/\mathbb{Z}$ taking values in a field F. Let G(N) denote the multiplicative group of $\mathbb{Z}/N\mathbb{Z}$, and for any function f on G(N) we extend f to a function on $\mathbb{Z}/N\mathbb{Z}$ by taking f to be zero off G(N). Define an element of the group algebra F[G(N)] by

$$g_N(r) = \frac{1}{|G(N)|} \sum_{a \in G(N)} h\left({\left\langle{\frac{ra}{N}}\right\rangle}\right) \sigma_a^{-1} .$$

The group algebras form a projective system with limit X. Then the functions g_{N} form a distribution on $\mathbb{Q}/\mathbb{Z}$ with values in X, the Stickelberger distribution associated with h.

== p-adic measures ==
Consider the special case when the value group V of a distribution φ on X takes values in a local field K, finite over Q_{p}, or more generally, in a finite-dimensional p-adic Banach space W over K, with valuation |·|. We call φ a measure if |φ| is bounded on compact open subsets of X. Let D be the ring of integers of K and L a lattice in W, that is, a free D-submodule of W with K ⊗ L = W. Up to scaling, a measure may be taken to have values in L.

=== Hecke operators and measures ===
Let D be a fixed integer prime to p and consider Z_{D}, the limit of the system Z/p^{n}D. Consider any eigenfunction of the Hecke operator T^{p} with eigenvalue λ_{p} prime to p. We describe a procedure for deriving a measure of Z_{D}.

Fix an integer N prime to p and to D. Let F be the D-module of all functions on rational numbers with denominator coprime to N. For any prime l not dividing N, we define the Hecke operator T_{l} by

$$(T_l f)\!\left(\frac a b\right) = f\!\left(\frac{la}{b}\right) + \sum_{k=0}^{l-1} f\!\left({\frac{a+kb}{lb}}\right) - \sum_{k=0}^{l-1} f\!\left(\frac k l \right)\! .$$

Let f be an eigenfunction for T_{p} with eigenvalue λ_{p} in D. The quadratic equation X^{2} − λ_{p}X + p = 0 has roots π_{1}, π_{2} with π_{1} a unit and π_{2} divisible by p. Define a sequence a_{0} = 2, a_{1} = π_{1}+π_{2} = λ_{p} and

$$a_{k+2} = \lambda_p a_{k+1} - p a_k ,$$

so that

$$a_k = \pi_1^k + \pi_2^k .$$
