= Ditkin set =

In mathematical analysis, a Ditkin set, introduced by (Ditkin 1939), is a closed subset of the circle such that a function f vanishing on the set can be approximated by functions φ_{n}f with φ vanishing in a neighborhood of the set.
