= Zorya Shapiro =

Russian mathematician

- Born: December 7, 1914
- Died: July 4, 2013 (aged 98); River Forest, Illinois
- Citizenship: Soviet
- Education: MSU Faculty of Mechanics and Mathematics
- Known for: Shapiro-Lopatinski condition in elliptic boundary value problems
- Spouse: Israel Gelfand
- Scientific career
- Fields: representation theory
- Thesis: (1938)

Zorya Yakovlevna Shapiro (Russian: Зоря Яковлевна Шапиро; 7 December 1914 – 4 July 2013) was a Soviet mathematician, educator and translator. She is known for her contributions to representation theory and functional analysis in her collaboration with Israel Gelfand, and the Shapiro-Lobatinski condition in elliptical boundary value problems.

== Life ==
Zorya Shapiro attended the Moscow State University Faculty of Mechanics and Mathematics from where she received her undergraduate and doctoral degrees by 1938. She was active in the military department of the university, especially in aviation, learning to fly and land aeroplanes.

She started her teaching career at the Faculty, shortly after Zoya Kishkina (1917–1989) and Natalya Eisenstadt (1912–1985), and very quickly became recognized for her courses in analysis.

Shapiro married Israel Gelfand in 1942. They had 3 sons, one of whom died in childhood. Shapiro and Gelfand later divorced.

In the 1980s, Shapiro lived in the same house as Akiva Yaglom. In 1991 Shapiro moved to River Forest, Illinois to live with her younger son. She died there on 4 July 2013.

== Career ==
Shapiro published several works on representation theory. A contribution (with Gelfand) in integral geometry was to find inversion formulae for the reconstruction of the value of a function on a manifold in terms of integrals over a family of submanifolds, a result with applicability in non-linear differential equations, tomography, multi-dimensional complex analysis and other domains. Another work was on the representations of rotation groups of 3-dimensional spaces.

Shapiro is best known for her elucidation of the conditions for well-defined solutions to the elliptical boundary value problem on Sobolev spaces.

== Selected publications ==
=== Articles ===
- "О существовании квазиконформных отображений". Доклады АН СССР. 30 (8). 1941.
- "Об эллиптических системах уравнений с частными производными". Доклады АН СССР. XLVI (4): 146–149. 1945.
- "Первая краевая задача для эллиптической системы дифференциальных уравнений" (PDF). Математический сборник. 28(70) (1): 55–78. 1951.
- "Представления группы вращений трёхмерного пространства и их применения". УМН. 7 (1(47)): 3–117. 1952. (with I.M. Gelfand)
- "Об общих краевых задачах для уравнений эллиптического типа" (PDF). Известия АН СССР. 17 (6): 539–565. 1953.
- "Однородные функции и их приложения" (PDF). Успехи математических наук. 10 (3(65)): 3–70. 1955. (with I.M. Gelfand)
- "Об одном классе обобщённых функций" (PDF). Успехи математических наук. 13 (3(81)): 205–212. 1958.
- "Интегральная геометрия на многообразии k-мерных плоскостей". Доклады АН СССР. 168 (6): 1236–1238. 1966. (with I.M. Gelfand, M.I. Graev)
- "Интегральная геометрия на k-мерных плоскостях" (PDF). Функциональный анализ и его приложения. 1 (1): 15–31. 1967. (with I.M. Gelfand, M.I. Graev)
- "Дифференциальные формы и интегральная геометрия" (PDF). Функциональный анализ и его приложения. 3 (2): 24–40. 1969. (with I.M. Gelfand, M.I. Graev)
- "Интегральная геометрия в проективном пространстве". Функциональный анализ и его приложения. 4 (1): 14–32. 1970. (with I.M. Gelfand, M.I. Graev)
- "Локальная задача интегральной геометрии в пространстве кривых" (PDF). Функциональный анализ и его приложения. 13 (2): 11–31. 1979. (with I.M. Gelfand, S.G. Gindikin)

=== Books ===
- Representations of the rotation and Lorentz groups and their applications. Macmillan. 1963. (with I.M. Gelfand, R.A. Minlos)

=== Translations ===
==== From French ====
- Jean Leray (1961). Дифференциальное и интегральное исчисления на комплексном аналитическом многообразии. Moscow: Foreign Literature.

==== From English ====
- Stanislaw Ulam (1964). Collection of Mathematical Problems [Нерешённые математические задачи]. Moscow: Nauka.
- Robert Finn (1989). Equilibrium Capillary Surfaces [Равновесные капиллярные поверхности: Математическая теория]. Moscow: Mir.
