= Measure algebra =

In mathematics, a measure algebra is a Boolean algebra with a countably additive positive measure. A probability measure on a measure space gives a measure algebra on the Boolean algebra of measurable sets modulo null sets.

== Definition ==
A measure algebra is a Boolean algebra $B$ with a measure $m$, which is a real-valued function on $B$ such that

- $m(0)=0,\ m(1)=1$,
- $m(x)>0$ if $x \neq 0$,
- $m(a)\leq m(b)$ for $a \leq b$,
- If $a_0, a_1, a_2, \dots$ are pairwise disjoint, then

$$m{\left(\sum_{n=0}^\infty a_n\right)} = \sum_{n=0}^\infty m(a_n).$$
