= Index group =

In operator theory, a branch of mathematics, every Banach algebra can be associated with a group called its abstract index group.

== Definition ==
Let A be a Banach algebra and G the group of invertible elements in A. The set G is open and a topological group. Consider the identity component

G_{0},

or in other words the connected component containing the identity 1 of A; G_{0} is a normal subgroup of G. The quotient group

Λ_{A} = G/G_{0}

is the abstract index group of A. Because G_{0}, being the component of an open set, is both open and closed in G, the index group is a discrete group.

== Examples ==
Let L(H) be the Banach algebra of bounded operators on a Hilbert space. The set of invertible elements in L(H) is path connected. Therefore, Λ_{L(H)} is the trivial group.

Let T denote the unit circle in the complex plane. The algebra C(T) of continuous functions from T to the complex numbers is a Banach algebra, with the topology of uniform convergence. A function in C(T) is invertible (meaning that it has a pointwise multiplicative inverse, not that it is an invertible function) if it does not map any element of T to zero. The group G_{0} consists of elements homotopic, in G, to the identity in G, the constant function 1. One can choose the functions f_{n}(z) = z^{n} as representatives in G of distinct homotopy classes of maps T→T. Thus the index group Λ_{C(T)} is the set of homotopy classes, indexed by the winding number of its members. Thus Λ_{C(T)} is isomorphic to the fundamental group of T. It is a countable discrete group.

The Calkin algebra K is the quotient C*-algebra of L(H) with respect to the compact operators. Suppose π is the quotient map. By Atkinson's theorem, an invertible elements in K is of the form π(T) where T is a Fredholm operators. The index group Λ_{K} is again a countable discrete group. In fact, Λ_{K} is isomorphic to the additive group of integers Z, via the Fredholm index. In other words, for Fredholm operators, the two notions of index coincide.
