= The Boston Driver's Handbook =

- Author: Gershkoff, Ira and Richard Trachtman
- Publication date: 1993

The Boston Driver's Handbook: Wild in the Streets is a 1982 humorous guide to driving in Boston by Ira Gershkoff and Richard Trachtman.

A third edition, The Boston Driver's Handbook: Wild in the Streets — The Almost Post Big Dig Edition, was published in 2004. ISBN 9780306813269
