= Vitalii Ditkin =

Soviet mathematician

Vitalii Arsenievich Ditkin (2 May 1910, Bogorodsk (now Noginsk), Russia – 17 October 1987, Moscow) was a Soviet mathematician who introduced Ditkin sets.

== Biography ==
Studied at the Moscow State University in 1932–1935; in 1938 got PhD degree (advisor – Abraham Plessner). From 1943 to 1948 he was with the Steklov Institute of Mathematics; from 1948 to 1955, with the Lebedev Institute of Precision Mechanics and Computer Engineering. In 1949, got the Doctor of Sciences degree. In 1955, he became a deputy director of newly formed Computing Centre of the Academy of Sciences of the USSR. He remained with the Computing Centre till his death.

In 1978 was awarded the USSR State Prize in sciences.
