= Lagrangian Grassmannian =

Type of vector space in mathematics

In mathematics, the Lagrangian Grassmannian is the smooth manifold of Lagrangian subspaces of a real symplectic vector space V. Its dimension is 1/2n(n + 1) (where the dimension of V is 2n). It may be identified with the homogeneous space

U(n)/O(n),

where U(n) is the unitary group and O(n) the orthogonal group. Following Vladimir Arnold it is denoted by Λ(n). The Lagrangian Grassmannian is a submanifold of the ordinary Grassmannian of V.

A complex Lagrangian Grassmannian is the complex homogeneous manifold of Lagrangian subspaces of a complex symplectic vector space V of dimension 2n. It may be identified with the homogeneous space of complex dimension 1/2n(n + 1)

Sp(n)/U(n),

where Sp(n) is the compact symplectic group.

== As a homogeneous space ==
To see that the Lagrangian Grassmannian Λ(n) can be identified with U(n)/O(n), note that $\mathbb{C}^n$ is a 2n-dimensional real vector space, with the imaginary part of its usual inner product making it into a symplectic vector space. The Lagrangian subspaces of $\mathbb{C}^n$ are then the real subspaces $L \subseteq \mathbb{C}^n$ of real dimension n on which the imaginary part of the inner product vanishes. An example is $\mathbb{R}^n \subseteq \mathbb{C}^n$. The unitary group U(n) acts transitively on the set of these subspaces, and the stabilizer of $\mathbb{R}^n$ is the orthogonal group $\mathrm{O}(n) \subseteq \mathrm{U}(n)$. It follows from the theory of homogeneous spaces that Λ(n) is isomorphic to U(n)/O(n) as a homogeneous space of U(n).

It is a compact manifold of dimension $n(n+1)/2$. It is a (real, nonsingular) projective algebraic variety. Given a Lagrangian subspace A, the set of Lagranigian subspaces complementary to A is affine. Given an arbitrary complementary subspace B, this affine space consists of the graphs of symmetric linear operators $u:B\to A$, $G(u) = \{b + u(b) | b\in B\}$. This is an affine space of dimension $n(n+1)/2$ since the dimensions of A and B are both n. Symmetry here means that the form $\omega(b,u(b'))$ is a symmetric form on B. Likewise, the tangent space at a lagrangian subspace A is the space of symmetric opeators $A\to A^*$.

From the fibration
$$1\to O(n)\to U(n)\to \Lambda(n)$$
the fundamental group may be inferred from the long exact homotopy sequence:
$$\pi_1(\Lambda(n)) = \mathbb Z.$$

== Topology ==
The stable topology of the Lagrangian Grassmannian and complex Lagrangian Grassmannian is completely understood, as these spaces appear in the Bott periodicity theorem: $\Omega(\mathrm{Sp}/\mathrm U) \simeq \mathrm U/\mathrm O$, and $\Omega(\mathrm U/ \mathrm O) \simeq \mathbb{Z}\times \mathrm{BO}$ – they are thus exactly the homotopy groups of the stable orthogonal group, up to a shift in indexing (dimension).

In particular, the fundamental group of $U/O$ is infinite cyclic. Its first homology group is therefore also infinite cyclic, as is its first cohomology group, with a distinguished generator given by the square of the determinant of a unitary matrix, as a mapping to the unit circle. Arnold showed that this leads to a description of the Maslov index, introduced by V. P. Maslov.

For a Lagrangian submanifold M of V, in fact, there is a mapping

$$M\to\Lambda(n)$$

which classifies its tangent space at each point (cf. Gauss map). The Maslov index is the pullback via this mapping, in

$$H^1(M, \mathbb{Z})$$

of the distinguished generator of

$$H^1(\Lambda(n), \mathbb{Z})$$.

The Lagrangian Grassmannian is the Shilov boundary of the Siegel upper half space.

== Maslov index ==
Given a fixed Lagrangian subspace $L$ in the Lagrangian Grassmannian $\Lambda$, the subset
$$M_L=\{V\in\Lambda \mid V\cap L\neq 0\}$$
is the Maslov cycle, a singular hypersurface in $\Lambda$. For a generic path of Lagrangian subspaces in $\Lambda$ whose endpoints are transverse to $L$, the Maslov index is the signed intersection number of the path with $M_L$. The Maslov index is invariant under homotopies of paths through Lagrangian subspaces, provided the endpoints remain transverse to the chosen reference Lagrangian $L$. For a loop, it depends only on the homotopy class of the loop and is independent of the choice of $L$.

The Maslov index is important in the study of caustics and semiclassical asymptotics. Roughly speaking, when a family of Lagrangian subspaces crosses the Maslov cycle, one encounters a caustic relative to the chosen reference Lagrangian $L$; in the theory of Fourier integral operators and the WKB approximation, such crossings produce phase corrections governed by the Maslov index.
