= Gelfand–Mazur theorem =

In operator theory, the Gelfand–Mazur theorem is a theorem named after Israel Gelfand and Stanisław Mazur which states that a Banach algebra with unit over the complex numbers in which every nonzero element is invertible is isometrically isomorphic to the complex numbers, i. e., the only complex Banach algebra that is a division algebra is the complex numbers $\mathbb{C}$.

The theorem follows from the fact that the spectrum of any element of a complex Banach algebra is nonempty: for every element $a$ of a complex Banach algebra $A$ there is some complex number $\lambda$ such that $\lambda 1 - a$ is not invertible. This is a consequence of the complex-analyticity of the resolvent function. By assumption, $\lambda 1 - a = 0$. So $a = \lambda \cdot 1$. This gives an isomorphism from $A$ to $\mathbb{C}$.

The theorem can be strengthened to the claim that there are (up to isomorphism) exactly three real Banach division algebras: the field of reals $\mathbb{R}$, the field of complex numbers $\mathbb{C}$, and the division algebra of quaternions $\mathbb{H}$. This result was proved first by Stanisław Mazur alone, but it was published in France without a proof, when the author refused the editor's request to shorten his proof. Gelfand (independently) published a proof of the complex case a few years later.
