= Uniform algebra =

Mathematical concept

In functional analysis, a uniform algebra A on a compact Hausdorff space X is a closed (with respect to the uniform norm) subalgebra of the C*-algebra C(X) (the continuous complex-valued functions on X) with the following properties:

the constant functions are contained in A
for every $x, y \in X$ there is $f \in A$ with $f(x) \ne f(y)$. This is called separating the points of X.

As a closed subalgebra of the commutative algebra (structure) Banach algebra C(X), a uniform algebra is itself a unital commutative Banach algebra (when equipped with the uniform norm). Hence, it is (by definition) a Banach function algebra.

A uniform algebra A on X is said to be natural if the maximal ideals of A are precisely the ideals $M_x$ of functions vanishing at a point x in X.

== Abstract characterization ==
If A is a unital commutative Banach algebra such that $\|a^2\| = \|a\|^2$ for all a in A, then there is a compact Hausdorff X such that A is isomorphic as a Banach algebra to a uniform algebra on X. This result follows from the spectral radius formula and the Gelfand representation.
