= Vanish at infinity =

In mathematics, a function is said to vanish at infinity if its values approach 0 as the input grows without bounds. There are two different ways to define this with one definition applying to functions defined on normed vector spaces and the other applying to functions defined on locally compact spaces. Aside from this difference, both of these notions correspond to the intuitive notion of adding a point at infinity, and requiring the values of the function to get arbitrarily close to zero as one approaches it. This definition can be formalized in many cases by adding an (actual) point at infinity.

== Definitions ==
A function $f:X\rightarrow\mathbb{C}$ on a normed vector space $(X,\|\cdot\|)$ is said to vanish at infinity if the values of the function approach $0$ as the input grows without bounds (that is, $f(x) \to 0$ as $\|x\| \to \infty$), i.e.,

$$\lim_{\|x\| \to \infty} f(x) = 0.$$

On the real line $X = \mathbb{R}$, this simplifies to

$$\lim_{x \to -\infty} f(x) = \lim_{x \to +\infty} f(x) = 0.$$

For example, the function

$$f(x) = \frac{1}{x^2+1},$$

defined on the real line, vanishes at infinity.

Alternatively, a function $f:\Omega\rightarrow\mathbb{K}$ on a locally compact space $\Omega$ vanishes at infinity, if given any positive number $\varepsilon > 0$, there exists a compact subset $K \subseteq \Omega$ such that

$$\forall x\in\Omega\setminus K\, ,\quad |f(x)| < \varepsilon.$$

In other words, for each positive number $\varepsilon > 0$, the set $\left\{ x \in \Omega : |f(x)| \geq \varepsilon \right\}$ has compact closure. For a given locally compact space $\Omega$, the set of such functions

$$f : \Omega \to \mathbb{K}$$

valued in $\mathbb{K},$ which is either $\R$ or $\C,$ forms a $\mathbb{K}$-vector space with respect to pointwise scalar multiplication and addition, which is often denoted $C_0(\Omega).$

As an example, the function

$$h(x, y) = \frac{1}{x+y}$$

where $x$ and $y$ are reals greater or equal 1 and correspond to the point $(x, y)$ on $\R_{\ge 1}^2$ vanishes at infinity.

A normed space is locally compact if and only if it is finite-dimensional so in this particular case, there are two different definitions of a function "vanishing at infinity". The two definitions could be inconsistent with each other: if $f(x) = \|x\|^{-1}$ in an infinite dimensional Banach space, then $f$ vanishes at infinity by the $\|f(x)\| \to 0$ definition, but not by the compact set definition.

== Rapidly decreasing ==
Refining the concept, one can look more closely to the rate of vanishing of functions at infinity. One of the basic intuitions of mathematical analysis is that the Fourier transform interchanges smoothness conditions with rate conditions on vanishing at infinity. Using big O notation, the rapidly decreasing test functions of tempered distribution theory are smooth functions that are

$$O\left(|x|^{-N}\right)$$

for all $N$, as $|x| \to \infty$, and such that all their partial derivatives satisfy the same condition too. This condition is set up so as to be self-dual under Fourier transform, so that the corresponding distribution theory of tempered distributions will have the same property.

== See also ==
- Infinity – Mathematical concept
- Projectively extended real line – Real numbers with an added point at infinity
- Zero of a function – Point where function's value is zero
