= Generalized function =

Objects extending the notion of functions

In mathematics, generalized functions are objects extending the notion of functions on real or complex numbers. There is more than one recognized theory, for example the theory of distributions. Generalized functions are especially useful for treating discontinuous functions more like smooth functions, and describing discrete physical phenomena such as point charges. They are applied extensively, especially in physics and engineering. Important motivations have been the technical requirements of theories of partial differential equations and group representations.

A common feature of some of the approaches is that they build on operator aspects of everyday, numerical functions. The early history is connected with some ideas on operational calculus, and some contemporary developments are closely related to Mikio Sato's algebraic analysis.

== Some early history ==
In the mathematics of the nineteenth century, aspects of generalized function theory appeared, for example in the definition of the Green's function, in the Laplace transform, and in Riemann's theory of trigonometric series, which were not necessarily the Fourier series of an integrable function. These were disconnected aspects of mathematical analysis at the time.

The intensive use of the Laplace transform in engineering led to the heuristic use of symbolic methods, called operational calculus. Since justifications were given that used divergent series, these methods were questionable from the point of view of pure mathematics. They are typical of later application of generalized function methods. An influential book on operational calculus was Oliver Heaviside's Electromagnetic Theory of 1899.

When the Lebesgue integral was introduced, there was for the first time a notion of generalized function central to mathematics. An integrable function, in Lebesgue's theory, is equivalent to any other which is the same almost everywhere. That means its value at each point is (in a sense) not its most important feature. In functional analysis a clear formulation is given of the essential feature of an integrable function, namely the way it defines a linear functional on other functions. This allows a definition of weak derivative.

During the late 1920s and 1930s further basic steps were taken. The Dirac delta function was boldly defined by Paul Dirac (an aspect of his scientific formalism); this was to treat measures, thought of as densities (such as charge density) like genuine functions. Sergei Sobolev, working in partial differential equation theory, defined the first rigorous theory of generalized functions in order to define weak solutions of partial differential equations (i.e. solutions which are generalized functions, but may not be ordinary functions). Others proposing related theories at the time were Salomon Bochner and Kurt Friedrichs. Sobolev's work was extended by Laurent Schwartz.

== Schwartz distributions ==
The most definitive development was the theory of distributions developed by Laurent Schwartz, systematically working out the principle of duality for topological vector spaces. Its main rival in applied mathematics is mollifier theory, which uses sequences of smooth approximations (the 'James Lighthill' explanation).

This theory was very successful and is still widely used, but suffers from the main drawback that distributions cannot usually be multiplied: unlike most classical function spaces, they do not form an algebra. For example, it is meaningless to square the Dirac delta function. Work of Schwartz from around 1954 showed this to be an intrinsic difficulty.

== Algebras of generalized functions ==
Some solutions to the multiplication problem have been proposed. One is based on a simple definition of by Yu. V. Egorov (see also his article in Demidov's book in the book list below) that allows arbitrary operations on, and between, generalized functions.

Another solution allowing multiplication is suggested by the path integral formulation of quantum mechanics. Since this is required to be equivalent to the Schrödinger theory of quantum mechanics which is invariant under coordinate transformations, this property must be shared by path integrals. This fixes all products of generalized functions as shown by H. Kleinert and A. Chervyakov. The result is equivalent to what can be derived from dimensional regularization.

Several constructions of algebras of generalized functions have been proposed, among others those by Yu. M. Shirokov and those by E. Rosinger, Y. Egorov, and R. Robinson. In the first case, the multiplication is determined with some regularization of generalized function. In the second case, the algebra is constructed as multiplication of distributions. Both cases are discussed below.

=== Non-commutative algebra of generalized functions ===
The algebra of generalized functions can be built-up with an appropriate procedure of projection of a function $F=F(x)$ to its smooth $F_{\rm smooth}$ and its singular $F_{\rm singular}$ parts. The product of generalized functions $F$ and $G$ appears as

$FG~=~ F_{\rm smooth}~G_{\rm smooth}~+~ F_{\rm smooth}~G_{\rm singular}~+ F_{\rm singular}~G_{\rm smooth}.$	1

Such a rule applies to both the space of main functions and the space of operators which act on the space of the main functions. The associativity of multiplication is achieved; and the function signum is defined in such a way, that its square is unity everywhere (including the origin of coordinates). Note that the product of singular parts does not appear in the right-hand side of (1); in particular, $\delta(x)^2=0$. Such a formalism includes the conventional theory of generalized functions (without their product) as a special case. However, the resulting algebra is non-commutative: generalized functions signum and delta anticommute. Few applications of the algebra were suggested.

=== Multiplication of distributions ===
The problem of multiplication of distributions, a limitation of the Schwartz distribution theory, becomes serious for non-linear problems.

Various approaches are used today. The simplest one is based on the definition of generalized function given by Yu. V. Egorov. Another approach to construct associative differential algebras is based on J.-F. Colombeau's construction: see Colombeau algebra. These are factor spaces

$$G = M / N$$

of "moderate" modulo "negligible" nets of functions, where "moderateness" and "negligibility" refers to growth with respect to the index of the family.

=== Example: Colombeau algebra ===
A simple example is obtained by using the polynomial scale on N, $s = \{ a_m:\mathbb N\to\mathbb R, n\mapsto n^m ;~ m\in\mathbb Z \}$. Then for any semi normed algebra (E,P), the factor space will be

$$G_s(E,P)= \frac{
\{ f\in E^{\mathbb N}\mid\forall p\in P,\exists m\in\mathbb Z:p(f_n)=o(n^m)\}
}{
\{ f\in E^{\mathbb N}\mid\forall p\in P,\forall m\in\mathbb Z:p(f_n)=o(n^m)\}
}.$$

In particular, for (E, P)=(C,|.|) one gets (Colombeau's) generalized complex numbers (which can be "infinitely large" and "infinitesimally small" and still allow for rigorous arithmetics, very similar to nonstandard numbers). For (E, P) = (C^{∞}(R),{p_{k}}) (where p_{k} is the supremum of all derivatives of order less than or equal to k on the ball of radius k) one gets Colombeau's simplified algebra.

=== Injection of Schwartz distributions ===
This algebra "contains" all distributions T of D' via the injection

j(T) = (φ_{n} ∗ T)_{n} + N,

where ∗ is the convolution operation, and

φ_{n}(x) = n φ(nx).

This injection is non-canonical in the sense that it depends on the choice of the mollifier φ, which should be C^{∞}, of integral one and have all its derivatives at 0 vanishing. To obtain a canonical injection, the indexing set can be modified to be N × D(R), with a convenient filter base on D(R) (functions of vanishing moments up to order q).

=== Sheaf structure ===
If (E,P) is a (pre-)sheaf of semi normed algebras on some topological space X, then G_{s}(E, P) will also have this property. This means that the notion of restriction will be defined, which allows to define the support of a generalized function w.r.t. a subsheaf, in particular:

- For the subsheaf {0}, one gets the usual support (complement of the largest open subset where the function is zero).
- For the subsheaf E (embedded using the canonical (constant) injection), one gets what is called the singular support, i.e., roughly speaking, the closure of the set where the generalized function is not a smooth function (for E = C^{∞}).

=== Microlocal analysis ===
The Fourier transformation being (well-)defined for compactly supported generalized functions (component-wise), one can apply the same construction as for distributions, and define Lars Hörmander's wave front set also for generalized functions.

This has an especially important application in the analysis of propagation of singularities.

== Other theories ==
These include: the convolution quotient theory of Jan Mikusinski, based on the field of fractions of convolution algebras that are integral domains; and the theories of hyperfunctions, based (in their initial conception) on boundary values of analytic functions, and now making use of sheaf theory.

== Topological groups ==
Bruhat introduced a class of test functions, the Schwartz–Bruhat functions, on a class of locally compact groups that goes beyond the manifolds that are the typical function domains. The applications are mostly in number theory, particularly to adelic algebraic groups. André Weil rewrote Tate's thesis in this language, characterizing the zeta distribution on the idele group; and has also applied it to the explicit formula of an L-function.

== Generalized section ==
A further way in which the theory has been extended is as generalized sections of a smooth vector bundle. This is on the Schwartz pattern, constructing objects dual to the test objects, smooth sections of a bundle that have compact support. The most developed theory is that of De Rham currents, dual to differential forms. These are homological in nature, in the way that differential forms give rise to De Rham cohomology. They can be used to formulate a very general Stokes' theorem.

== See also ==
- Beppo-Levi space
- Dirac delta function
- Generalized eigenfunction
- Distribution (mathematics)
- Hyperfunction
- Laplacian of the indicator
- Rigged Hilbert space
- Limit of a distribution
- Generalized space
- Ultradistribution

== Books ==
- Schwartz, L. (1950). Théorie des distributions. Vol. 1. Paris: Hermann. OCLC 889264730. Vol. 2. OCLC 889391733
- Beurling, A. (1961). On quasianalyticity and general distributions (multigraphed lectures). Summer Institute, Stanford University. OCLC 679033904.
- Gelʹfand, Izrailʹ Moiseevič; Vilenkin, Naum Jakovlevič (1964). Generalized Functions. Vol. I–VI. Academic Press. OCLC 728079644.
- Hörmander, L. (2015) [1990]. The Analysis of Linear Partial Differential Operators (2nd ed.). Springer. ISBN 978-3-642-61497-2.
- H. Komatsu, Introduction to the theory of distributions, Second edition, Iwanami Shoten, Tokyo, 1983.
- Colombeau, J.-F. (2000) [1983]. New Generalized Functions and Multiplication of Distributions. Elsevier. ISBN 978-0-08-087195-0.
- Vladimirov, V.S.; Drozhzhinov, Yu. N.; Zav’yalov, B.I. (2012) [1988]. Tauberian theorems for generalized functions. Springer. ISBN 978-94-009-2831-2.
- Oberguggenberger, M. (1992). Multiplication of distributions and applications to partial differential equations. Longman. ISBN 978-0-582-08733-0. OCLC 682138968.
- Morimoto, M. (1993). An introduction to Sato's hyperfunctions. American Mathematical Society. ISBN 978-0-8218-8767-7.
- Demidov, A.S. (2001). Generalized Functions in Mathematical Physics: Main Ideas and Concepts. Nova Science. ISBN 9781560729051.
- Grosser, M.; Kunzinger, M.; Oberguggenberger, Michael; Steinbauer, R. (2013) [2001]. Geometric theory of generalized functions with applications to general relativity. Springer. ISBN 978-94-015-9845-3.
- Estrada, R.; Kanwal, R. (2012). A distributional approach to asymptotics. Theory and applications (2nd ed.). Birkhäuser Boston. ISBN 978-0-8176-8130-2.
- Vladimirov, V.S. (2002). Methods of the theory of generalized functions. Taylor & Francis. ISBN 978-0-415-27356-5.
- Kleinert, H. (2009). Path Integrals in Quantum Mechanics, Statistics, Polymer Physics, and Financial Markets (5th ed.). World Scientific. ISBN 9789814273572. (online here). See Chapter 11 for products of generalized functions.
- Pilipovi, S.; Stankovic, B.; Vindas, J. (2012). Asymptotic behavior of generalized functions. World Scientific. ISBN 9789814366847.
