= Multi-index notation =

Mathematical notation

Multi-index notation is a mathematical notation that simplifies formulas used in multivariable calculus, partial differential equations and the theory of distributions, by generalising the concept of an integer index to an ordered tuple of indices.

== Definition and basic properties ==
An n-dimensional multi-index is an $n$-tuple

$$\alpha = (\alpha_1, \alpha_2,\ldots,\alpha_n)$$

of non-negative integers (i.e. an element of the $n$-dimensional set of natural numbers, denoted $\mathbb{N}^n_0$).

For multi-indices $\alpha, \beta \in \mathbb{N}^n_0$ and $x = (x_1, x_2, \ldots, x_n) \in \mathbb{R}^n$, one defines:

Componentwise sum
$$\alpha + \beta= (\alpha_1 + \beta_1,\,\alpha_2 + \beta_2, \ldots, \,\alpha_n + \beta_n)$$
Partial order
$$\alpha \le \beta \quad \Leftrightarrow \quad \alpha_i \le \beta_i \quad \forall\,i\in\{1,\ldots,n\}$$
Difference
If $\alpha \le \beta$ then $(\beta-\alpha)_i = \beta_i-\alpha_i$
else the difference is undefined.
Length
$$| \alpha | = \alpha_1 + \alpha_2 + \cdots + \alpha_n$$
Factorial
$$\alpha ! = \alpha_1! \cdot \alpha_2! \cdots \alpha_n!$$
Binomial coefficient
$$\binom{\alpha}{\beta} = \binom{\alpha_1}{\beta_1}\binom{\alpha_2}{\beta_2}\cdots\binom{\alpha_n}{\beta_n} = \frac{\alpha!}{\beta!(\alpha-\beta)!}$$
Multinomial coefficient
$$\binom{k}{\alpha} = \frac{k!}{\alpha_1! \alpha_2! \cdots \alpha_n! } = \frac{k!}{\alpha!}$$
where $k:=|\alpha|\in\mathbb{N}_0$.
Power
$$x^\alpha = x_1^{\alpha_1} x_2^{\alpha_2} \ldots x_n^{\alpha_n}$$.
Higher-order partial derivative
$$\partial^\alpha = \partial_1^{\alpha_1} \partial_2^{\alpha_2} \ldots \partial_n^{\alpha_n},$$

where $\partial_i^{\alpha_i}:=(\partial / \partial x_i)^{\alpha_i}.$

== Some applications ==
The multi-index notation allows the extension of many formulae from elementary calculus to the corresponding multi-variable case. Below are some examples. In all the following, $x,y,h\in\Complex^n$ (or $\R^n$), and $\alpha,\beta, \nu\in\N_0^n$.

=== Derivative of a monomial ===
$$\partial^\alpha x^\beta = \begin{cases}
\frac{\beta!}{(\beta-\alpha)!} x^{\beta-\alpha}, & \text{if}~ \alpha\le\beta,\\
0, & \text{otherwise.}
\end{cases}$$

=== Multinomial theorem ===
$$\left( \sum_{i=1}^n x_i\right)^k = \sum_{|\alpha|=k} \binom{k}{\alpha} \, x^\alpha.$$

=== Multi-binomial theorem ===
$$(x+y)^\alpha = \sum_{\nu \le \alpha} \binom{\alpha}{\nu} \, x^\nu y^{\alpha - \nu}.$$
Note that, since x + y is a vector and α is a multi-index, the expression on the left is short for (x_{1} + y_{1})^{α_{1}}⋯(x_{n} + y_{n})^{α_{n}}.

=== Leibniz formula ===
For smooth functions $f$ and $g$,
$$\partial^\alpha(fg) = \sum_{\nu \le \alpha} \binom{\alpha}{\nu} \, \partial^{\nu}f\,\partial^{\alpha-\nu}g.$$

=== Taylor series ===
For an analytic function $f$ in $n$ variables one has
$$f(x+h) = \sum_{\alpha\in\mathbb{N}^n_0} {\frac{\partial^{\alpha}f(x)}{\alpha !}h^\alpha}.$$
In fact, for a smooth enough function, we have the similar Taylor expansion
$$f(x+h) = \sum_{|\alpha| \le n}{\frac{\partial^{\alpha}f(x)}{\alpha !}h^\alpha}+R_{n}(x,h),$$
where the last term (the remainder) depends on the exact version of Taylor's formula. For instance, for the Cauchy formula (with integral remainder), one gets
$$R_n(x,h)= (n+1) \sum_{|\alpha| =n+1}\frac{h^\alpha}{\alpha !} \int_0^1(1-t)^n\partial^\alpha f(x+th) \, dt.$$

=== Integration by parts ===
For smooth functions $u$ and $v$ with compact support in $\R^n$,
$$\int_{\R^n} u(\partial^{\alpha}v) \, dx = (-1)^{|\alpha|} \int_{\R^n} {(\partial^{\alpha}u)v\,dx}.$$
This formula is used for the definition of weak derivatives of distributions.

== See also ==
- Einstein notation
- Index notation
- Ricci calculus
