= Flat function =

Function whose all derivatives vanish at a point

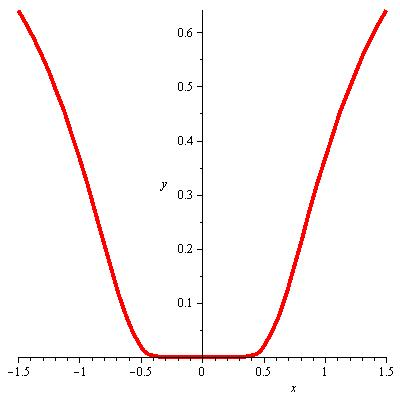
The graph of $f:\mathbb{R}\to\mathbb{R}$ such that $f(0)=0$ and that for all $x\in\mathbb{R}$, $x\neq0$ implies $f(x)=e^{-1/x^2}$

In real analysis, a real function is defined to be flat at a point in its domain if all its derivatives or partial derivatives exist at that point and equal $0$.

A real function is locally constant (that is, constant in at least one neighbourhood) of a point in the interior of its domain if and only if the function is flat and analytic at that point.

An example of a function that is flat only at an isolated point is $f:\mathbb{R}\to\mathbb{R}$ such that $f(0)=0$ and that for all $x\in\mathbb{R}$, $x\neq0$ implies $f(x)=e^{-1/x^2}$; the function $f$ is flat only at $0$.

Since $f$ is not analytic at $0$, the extension of $f$ to $\mathbb{C}$ is not holomorphic at $0$, since for complex functions, holomorphicity at a point implies analyticity at that point.

== Examples of construction of non-trivial flat functions ==
By a non-trivial flat function, what is meant is a function that, at least at one point in the interior of its domain, is flat but not locally constant.

=== Construction of univariate flat functions ===
Let $a$ be a positive real number and let $g:S\to\mathbb{R}$ (where $S\subseteq\mathbb{R}$ is a neighbourhood of a point $x_{0}\in\mathbb{R}$) be such that $g(x_{0})=0$ and that for all $x\in S$, $x\neq x_{0}$ implies $g(x)=\operatorname{exp}(-|x-x_{0}|^{-a}).$

Then $g$ is flat at $x_{0}$.

=== Construction of multivariate flat functions ===
Let $G:\mathbb{R}\to\mathbb{R}$ be flat at $0$, and let $H:P\to\mathbb{R}$ (where $n\in\mathbb{N}$, $\mathbf{x}_{0}$ is an $n$-dimensional real coordinate vector, and $P\subseteq\mathbb{R}^{n}$ is a neighbourhood of $\mathbf{x}_{0}$) be such that for all $\mathbf{x}\in P$,$H(\mathbf{x})=G(||\mathbf{x}-\mathbf{x}_{0}||)$, where for all $\mathbf{p}\in\mathbb{R}^{n}$, $||\mathbf{p}||$ denotes the Euclidean norm of $\mathbf{p}$.

Then $H$ is flat at $\mathbf{x}_{0}$.

== A necessary condition for flatness and local non-constancy ==
Let $S\subseteq\mathbb{R}^{n}$ for some $n\in\mathbb{N}$ and let $F:S\to\mathbb{R}$ be flat at a point $x_{0}$ in the interior of $S$. Also let it be the case that for every neighbourhood $N$ of $x_{0}$, there exists an $x\in N$ such that $F(x)\neq F(x_{0})$, that is, that $F$ is not locally constant at $x_{0}$. Then $F$ is non-analytic at $x_{0}$.

=== Proof ===
Assume the contrary, that is, that $F$ is analytic at $x_{0}$. Since $F$ is flat at $x_{0}$, the Taylor series of $F$ at $x_{0}$ is constant and equal to $F(x_{0})$. Since it is assumed that $F$ is analytic at $x_{0}$, then there exists a neighbourhood $N$ of $x_{0}$ such that for all $x\in N$, $F(x)=F(x_{0})$. This contradicts that for every neighbourhood $N$ of $x_{0}$, there exists an $x\in N$ such that $F(x)\neq F(x_{0})$. Hence, by contradiction, $F$ is non-analytic at $x_{0}$.

== A sufficient condition for flatness ==
Let $S\subseteq\mathbb{R}^{n}$ for some $n\in\mathbb{N}$ and let $F:S\to\mathbb{R}$ be infinitely differentiable at a point $x_{0}$ in the interior of $S$. Also let it be the case that for every neighbourhood $N$ of $x_{0}$, there exists an $x\in N$ such that $F$ is flat at $x$. Then $F$ is flat at $x_{0}$.

=== Proof ===
Assume the contrary, that is, that $F$ is not flat at $x_{0}$. Then there exists a $k\in\mathbb{N}$ such that a $k$-th partial derivative of $F$ (call it $F_{k}$) is non-zero at $x_{0}$, that is, $F_{k}(x_{0})=r$ for some $r\in\mathbb{R}$ such that $r\neq0$. Since $F$ is infinitely differentiable at $x_{0}$, then $F_{k}$ is continuous at $x_{0}$. Since $r\neq0$, then $|r|/2>0$. Then there exists a neighbourhood $N$ of $x_{0}$ such that for all $x\in N$, $|F_{k}(x)-F_{k}(x_{0})|<|r|/2$, which means $|F_{k}(x)-r|<|r|/2$, or, in other words, $F_{k}(x)$ lies in the open interval $(\operatorname{min}\{r/2,3r/2\},\operatorname{max}\{r/2,3r/2\})$. Since $r\neq0$, $0\notin(\operatorname{min}\{r/2,3r/2\},\operatorname{max}\{r/2,3r/2\})$, so $F_{k}(x)\neq0$, which means that there exists a $k\in\mathbb{N}$ such that a $k$-th partial derivative of $F$ is non-zero at $x$. This contradicts that $F$ is flat at at least one point in every neighbourhood of $x_{0}$. Hence, by contradiction, $F$ is flat at $x_{0}$.

The above results can be used to show that a bump function is flat and non-analytic at each boundary point of the closure of its support.

== Flatness of smooth interpolations ==
Let $s_{1}\in\mathbb{R}$ and $s_{2}\in\mathbb{R}$ be such that $s_{1}<s_{2}$.

Let $I_{1}\subset\mathbb{R}$ be an interval with non-empty interior, with supremum $s_{1}$, and containing $s_{1}$; and let $I_{2}\subset\mathbb{R}$ be an interval with non-empty interior, with infimum $s_{2}$, and containing $s_{2}$.

In the following, continuity, one-sided continuity, one-sided limits, differentiability and smoothness of a real coordinate vector-valued function are respectively given by continuity, one-sided continuity, one-sided limits, differentiability and smoothness of the function in each coordinate.

Let $n\in\mathbb{N}$. Let $\mathbf{r}_{1}:I_{1}\to\mathbb{R}^{n}$ be continuously differentiable at every point in the interior of $I_{1}$, left-continuous at $s_{1}$ and have the left-hand limit of its derivatives of all orders be finite at $s_{1}$; also let $||\mathbf{r}_{1}'(s)||=1$ for all $s\in \operatorname{int}(I_{1})$. Let $\mathbf{r}_{2}:I_{2}\to\mathbb{R}^{n}$ be continuously differentiable at every point in the interior of $I_{2}$, right-continuous at $s_{2}$ and have the right-hand limit of its derivatives of all orders be finite at $s_{2}$; also let $||\mathbf{r}_{2}'(s)||=1$ for all $s\in \operatorname{int}(I_{2})$.

Let curves $C_{1}$ and $C_{2}$ be the images of the domains of $\mathbf{r}_{1}$ and $\mathbf{r}_{2}$, respectively. Both $C_{1}$ and $C_{2}$ inhabit $\mathbb{R}^{n}$.

A smooth interpolation between $C_{1}$ and $C_{2}$, between the points $\mathbf{r}_{1}(s_{1})$ and $\mathbf{r}_{2}(s_{2})$, is the image of the domain of a function $\mathbf{r}_{0}:(s_{1},s_{2})\to\mathbb{R}^{n}$ such that the left-hand limit of $\mathbf{r}_{0}$ at $s_{1}$ is $\mathbf{r}_{1}(s_{1})$, the right-hand limit of $\mathbf{r}_{0}$ at $s_{2}$ is $\mathbf{r}_{2}(s_{2})$, and for all $k\in\mathbb{N}$, the left-hand limit of the $k$-th derivative of $\mathbf{r}_{0}$ at $s_{1}$ is equal to the right-hand limit of the $k$-th derivative of $\mathbf{r}_{1}$ at $s_{1}$, and the right-hand limit of the $k$-th derivative of $\mathbf{r}_{0}$ at $s_{2}$ is equal to the left-hand limit of the $k$-th derivative of $\mathbf{r}_{2}$ at $s_{2}$. A smooth interpolation between $C_{1}$ and $C_{2}$ is defined to have $G^{\infty}$ continuity (geometric continuity of all orders) with $C_{1}$ and $C_{2}$.

Let $\mathbf{r}:I_{1}\cup(s_{1},s_{2})\cup I_{2}\to\mathbb{R}^{n}$ be such that: for all $s\in I_{1}$, $\mathbf{r}(s)=\mathbf{r}_{1}(s)$; for all $s\in(s_{1},s_{2})$, $\mathbf{r}(s)=\mathbf{r}_{0}(s)$; and for all $s\in I_{2}$, $\mathbf{r}(s)=\mathbf{r}_{2}(s)$.

If $C_{1}$ and $C_{2}$ are straight line segments, $\mathbf{r}$ is necessarily flat at $s_{1}$ and $s_{2}$. If $C_{1}$ and $C_{2}$ are non-collinear straight line segments, there necessarily exists a point in $[s_{1},s_{2}]$ at which $\mathbf{r}$ is non-analytic. If the end segments of the smooth interpolation are not straight-segment extensions of line segments $C_{1}$ and $C_{2}$, $\mathbf{r}$ is necessarily non-analytic at $s_{1}$ and $s_{2}$.

== See also ==
- Bump function
- Continuous function
- Differentiable function
- Smoothness
- Analytic function
- Support (mathematics)
- Non-analytic smooth function
