= Test function =

Auxiliary functions used to probe equations, distributions, and weak formulations

Test functions are auxiliary functions used in mathematical analysis to probe other functions, distributions, differential equations, or variational identities. They are usually chosen from a class of functions with enough regularity, decay, or boundary behavior to justify operations such as integration by parts, localization, and passage to weak limits.

== Common spaces of test functions ==
=== Compactly supported smooth functions ===
Let U be an open subset of R^{n}. With minor modifications, one can replace R^{n} by any (paracompact) smooth manifold.

The space D(U) of test functions on U is defined as follows. A function $\varphi$ : U → R is said to have compact support if there exists a compact subset K of U such that $\varphi$(x) = 0 for all x in U \ K. The elements of D(U) are the infinitely differentiable functions $\varphi$ : U → R with compact support. This is a real vector space.

It can be given a topology by defining the limit of a sequence of elements of D(U). A sequence ($\varphi$_{k}) in D(U) is said to converge to $\varphi$ ∈ D(U) if the following two conditions hold:

- There is a compact set K ⊂ U containing the supports of all $\varphi$_{k}:

$$\bigcup\nolimits_k \operatorname{supp}(\varphi_k)\subset K.$$

- For each multi-index α, the sequence of partial derivatives $\partial^\alpha \varphi_k$ tends uniformly to $\partial^\alpha\varphi$.

With this definition, D(U) becomes a complete locally convex topological vector space.

Now let U be the union of U_{i} where {U_{i}} is a countable nested family of open subsets of U with compact closures K_{i} = U̅_{i}. Then we have the countable increasing union

$$\mathrm{D}(U) = \bigcup\nolimits_i \mathrm{D}_{K_i}$$

where D_{K_{i}} is the set of all smooth functions on U with support lying in K_{i}. On each D_{K_{i}}, consider the topology given by the seminorms

$$\| \varphi \|_\alpha = \max_{x \in K_i} \left |\partial^\alpha \varphi \right |,$$

i.e. the topology of uniform convergence of derivatives of arbitrary order. This makes each D_{K_{i}} a Fréchet space. The resulting LF space structure on D(U) is the topology described above.

=== Schwartz functions ===
The Schwartz space S(R^{n}) is the function space of all infinitely differentiable functions that are rapidly decreasing at infinity along with all partial derivatives. Thus φ : R^{n} → R is in the Schwartz space provided that any derivative of $\varphi$, multiplied with any power of |x|, converges towards 0 for |x| → ∞. These functions form a complete topological vector space with a suitably defined family of seminorms.

More precisely, let

$$p_{\alpha , \beta} (\varphi) = \sup_{x \in \mathbf{R}^n} \left| x^\alpha D^\beta \varphi(x)\right|$$

for α, β multi-indices of size n. Then $\varphi$ is a Schwartz function if all the values satisfy

$$p_{\alpha, \beta} (\varphi) < \infty.$$

The family of seminorms p_{α, β} defines a locally convex topology on the Schwartz space. When n is equal to 1, the seminorms are, in fact, norms on the Schwartz space. Otherwise, one can define a norm on S(R^{n}) via

$\| \varphi \|_{k} = \max_{|\alpha| + |\beta| \leq k} \sup_{x \in \mathbf{R}^n} \left| x^\alpha D^\beta \varphi(x)\right|$ for k ≥ 1.

The Schwartz space is metrizable and complete. Because the Fourier transform changes differentiation by x^{α} into multiplication by x^{α} and vice versa, this symmetry implies that the Fourier transform of a Schwartz function is also a Schwartz function.

=== Sobolev test spaces ===
In the theory of weak formulations and weak solutions of partial differential equations, the term test function is often used more broadly than in distribution theory. One may first test an equation against functions in $C_c^\infty(U)$, and then pass to a larger Sobolev space by density or completion. In this setting, a test function is usually an admissible function from the space in which the weak identity is required to hold.

For example, if $U\subseteq\mathbb R^n$ is open, the Sobolev space $W_0^{k,p}(U)$ is commonly defined as the closure of $C_c^\infty(U)$ in the Sobolev norm of $W^{k,p}(U)$. Thus elements of $W_0^{k,p}(U)$ need not be smooth, but they can be approximated in the Sobolev norm by compactly supported smooth functions. For this reason, functions in Sobolev spaces such as $H_0^1(U)$ are often used as test functions in variational formulations.

A typical example is the weak form of the Poisson equation. Instead of requiring a function $u$ to satisfy $-\Delta u=f$ pointwise, one asks that

$$\int_U \nabla u\cdot\nabla v\,dx=\int_U fv\,dx$$

for all test functions $v$ in a suitable space, commonly $C_c^\infty(U)$ at first, or $H_0^1(U)$ after completion. The choice of test space encodes boundary conditions: for instance, the space $H_0^1(U)$ corresponds to homogeneous Dirichlet boundary conditions in the trace sense on sufficiently regular domains.

This use of the term should be distinguished from the distribution-theoretic convention, where the test functions themselves are usually smooth. In weak formulations, the word test emphasizes the role of the function in probing an equation or variational identity, rather than membership in a fixed smooth test-function space.

=== Test functions on manifolds ===
Test functions can also be defined on smooth manifolds. If $M$ is a smooth manifold, the space $C_c^\infty(M)$ consists of smooth real-valued or complex-valued functions on $M$ with compact support. If $M$ is compact, then $C_c^\infty(M)=C^\infty(M)$; on a non-compact manifold, the compact-support condition is a genuine restriction.

As in the Euclidean case, $C_c^\infty(M)$ is used for localization, integration by parts, and the definition of distributions. More intrinsically, distributions on a manifold may be defined as continuous linear functionals on compactly supported smooth densities, or, after choosing a smooth positive density or a Riemannian volume form, as continuous linear functionals on $C_c^\infty(M)$.

More generally, if $E\to M$ is a smooth vector bundle, the compactly supported smooth sections $\Gamma_c(E)$ play the role of test functions with values in $E$. This is useful, for example, when defining weak or distributional sections of the dual bundle, differential forms with distributional coefficients, or weak formulations of equations for vector-valued unknowns.

The topology on $C_c^\infty(M)$ is defined locally in the same way as for $C_c^\infty(U)$ on open subsets of Euclidean space. On each compact subset, convergence means uniform convergence of all derivatives in local coordinates; globally, the usual topology is an inductive limit over compact subsets. Partitions of unity and smooth cutoff functions allow many local constructions with Euclidean test functions to be transferred to manifolds.

== Use in weak formulations ==
In the study of partial differential equations, test functions are used to pass from a differential equation in pointwise form (called the classical form) to a weak formulation. The usual procedure is to multiply the equation by a test function, integrate over the domain, and use integration by parts to transfer derivatives from the unknown function onto the test function. This allows the formulation of equations for functions that may not possess all derivatives appearing in the original equation in the classical sense.

For example, suppose that $U\subseteq\mathbb R^n$ is an open set and consider the Poisson equation

$$-\Delta u=f.$$

If $u$ and $f$ are sufficiently smooth and $\varphi\in C_c^\infty(U)$, then multiplying by $\varphi$ and integrating gives

$$\int_U (-\Delta u)\varphi\,dx=\int_U f\varphi\,dx.$$

An integration by parts, with no boundary term because $\varphi$ has compact support in $U$, gives

$$\int_U \nabla u\cdot\nabla\varphi\,dx=\int_U f\varphi\,dx.$$

This identity still makes sense under weaker assumptions than the original equation. For instance, if $u\in H^1_{\operatorname{loc}}(U)$ and $f\in L^2_{\operatorname{loc}}(U)$, then $u$ may be called a weak solution of $-\Delta u=f$ if the identity holds for every $\varphi\in C_c^\infty(U)$.

When boundary conditions are included, the test space is often chosen to encode them. For the homogeneous Dirichlet problem for the Poisson equation, one commonly seeks $u\in H_0^1(U)$ such that

$$\int_U \nabla u\cdot\nabla v\,dx=\int_U fv\,dx$$

for all $v\in H_0^1(U)$. In this formulation, the test functions need not themselves be smooth: they can belong to the Sobolev space obtained as a completion of compactly supported smooth functions in the relevant Sobolev norm.

Test functions also appear in variational arguments. If a functional is differentiated along perturbations of the form $u+\varepsilon\varphi$, the auxiliary function $\varphi$ is often called a test function or variation. Requiring the first variation to vanish for all such $\varphi$ leads to the Euler–Lagrange equation in weak form.

== See also ==
- Bump function
- Schwartz space
- Distribution (mathematics)
- Weak derivative
- Weak solution
- Sobolev space
- Mollifier

== Sources ==
- Gel'fand, I.M.; Shilov, G.E. (1966–1968), Generalized functions, vol. 1–5, Academic Press.
- Rudin, W. (1991), Functional Analysis (2nd ed.), McGraw–Hill, ISBN 0-07-054236-8.
