= Non-analytic smooth function =

Mathematical functions which are smooth but not analytic

In real analysis, a smooth function is infinitely differentiable at each point in its domain, while a real analytic function is, at each point in its domain, the limit of a convergent power series in a neighbourhood of that point. All real analytic functions are smooth, but there exist smooth real functions that are not real analytic, as given below.

The existence of smooth but non-analytic functions represents one of the main differences between differential geometry and analytic geometry. In terms of sheaf theory, this difference can be stated as follows: the sheaf of differentiable functions on a differentiable manifold is fine, in contrast with the analytic case.

Smooth real functions with domain $\mathbb{R}^{n}$ and with support of compact closure (bump functions) are non-analytic at each boundary point of the closure of its support. One of the most important applications of smooth functions with support of compact closure is the construction of so-called mollifiers, which are important in theories of generalized functions, such as Laurent Schwartz's theory of distributions.

The functions below are generally used to build up partitions of unity on differentiable manifolds.

== An example function ==
=== Definition of the function ===
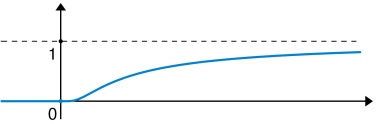
The non-analytic smooth function f(x) considered in the article.

Consider the function
$$f(x)=\begin{cases}e^{-\frac{1}{x}}&\text{if }x>0,\\ 0&\text{if }x\le0,\end{cases}$$
defined for every real number x.

=== The function is smooth ===
The function f has continuous derivatives of all orders at every point x of the real line. The formula for these derivatives is
$$f^{(n)}(x) = \begin{cases}\displaystyle\frac{p_n(x)}{x^{2n}}\,f(x) & \text{if }x>0, \\ 0 &\text{if }x \le 0,\end{cases}$$
where p_{n}(x) is a polynomial of degree n − 1 given recursively by p_{1}(x) = 1 and
$$p_{n+1}(x)=x^2p_n'(x)-(2nx-1)p_n(x)$$
for any positive integer n. From this formula, it is not completely clear that the derivatives are continuous at 0; this follows from the one-sided limit
$$\lim_{x\searrow 0} \frac{e^{-\frac{1}{x}}}{x^m} = 0$$
for any nonnegative integer m.

Detailed proof of smoothness

By the power series representation of the exponential function, we have for every natural number $m$ (including zero)
$$\frac1{x^m}=x\Bigl(\frac1{x}\Bigr)^{m+1}\le (m+1)!\,x\sum_{n=0}^\infty\frac1{n!}\Bigl(\frac1x\Bigr)^n
=(m+1)!\,x e^{\frac{1}{x}},\qquad x>0,$$
because all the positive terms for $n \neq m+1$ are added. Therefore, dividing this inequality by $e^{\frac{1}{x}}$ and taking the limit from above,
$$\lim_{x\searrow0}\frac{e^{-\frac{1}{x}}}{x^m}
\le (m+1)!\lim_{x\searrow0}x=0.$$

We now prove the formula for the nth derivative of f by mathematical induction. Using the chain rule, the reciprocal rule, and the fact that the derivative of the exponential function is again the exponential function, we see that the formula is correct for the first derivative of f for all x > 0 and that p_{1}(x) is a polynomial of degree 0. Of course, the derivative of f is zero for x < 0. It remains to show that the right-hand side derivative of f at x = 0 is zero. Using the above limit, we see that
$$f'(0)=\lim_{x\searrow0}\frac{f(x)-f(0)}{x-0}=\lim_{x\searrow0}\frac{e^{-\frac{1}{x}}}{x}=0.$$

The induction step from n to n + 1 is similar. For x > 0 we get for the derivative
$$\begin{align}f^{(n+1)}(x)
&=\biggl(\frac{p'_n(x)}{x^{2n}}-2n\frac{p_n(x)}{x^{2n+1}}+\frac{p_n(x)}{x^{2n+2}}\biggr)f(x)\\
&=\frac{x^2p'_n(x)-(2nx-1)p_n(x)}{x^{2n+2}}f(x)\\
&=\frac{p_{n+1}(x)}{x^{2(n+1)}}f(x),\end{align}$$
where p_{n+1}(x) is a polynomial of degree n = (n + 1) − 1. Of course, the (n + 1)st derivative of f is zero for x < 0. For the right-hand side derivative of f^{(n)} at x = 0 we obtain with the above limit
$$\lim_{x\searrow0} \frac{f^{(n)}(x) - f^{(n)}(0)}{x-0} = \lim_{x\searrow0} \frac{p_n(x)}{x^{2n+1}}\,e^{-1/x} = 0.$$

=== The function is not analytic ===
As seen earlier, the function f is smooth, and all its derivatives at the origin are 0. Therefore, the Taylor series of f at the origin converges everywhere to the zero function,
$$\sum_{n=0}^\infty \frac{f^{(n)}(0)}{n!}x^n=\sum_{n=0}^\infty \frac{0}{n!}x^n = 0,\qquad x\in\mathbb{R},$$
and so the Taylor series does not equal f(x) for x > 0. Consequently, f is not analytic at the origin.

=== Smooth transition functions ===
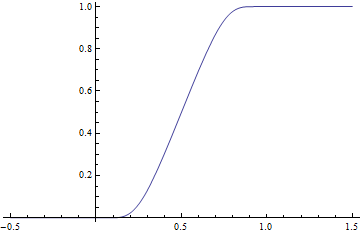
The smooth transition g from 0 to 1 defined here.

The function
$$g(x)=\frac{f(x)}{f(x)+f(1-x)},\qquad x\in\mathbb{R},$$
has a strictly positive denominator everywhere on the real line, hence g is also smooth. Furthermore, g(x) = 0 for x ≤ 0 and g(x) = 1 for x ≥ 1, hence it provides a smooth transition from the level 0 to the level 1 in the unit interval [0, 1]. To have the smooth transition in the real interval [a, b] with a < b, consider the function
$$\mathbb{R}\ni x\mapsto g\Bigl(\frac{x-a}{b-a}\Bigr).$$

For real numbers a < b < c < d, the smooth function
$$\mathbb{R}\ni x\mapsto g\Bigl(\frac{x-a}{b-a}\Bigr)\,g\Bigl(\frac{d-x}{d-c}\Bigr)$$
equals 1 on the closed interval [b, c] and vanishes outside the open interval (a, d), hence it can serve as a bump function.

== A smooth function that is nowhere real analytic ==
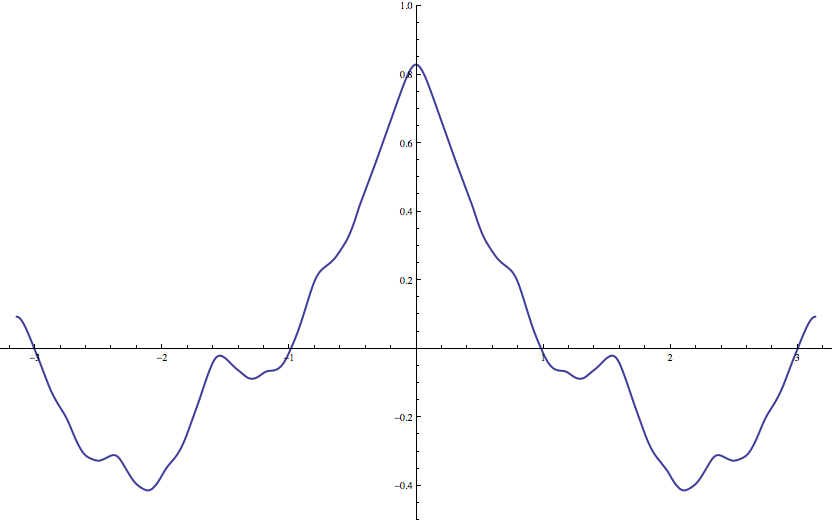
Approximation of the smooth-everywhere, but nowhere-analytic function mentioned here. This partial sum is taken from k = 0 to 500.

A more pathological example is an infinitely differentiable function which is not analytic at any point. It can be constructed by means of a Fourier series as follows. Define for all $x \in \mathbb{R}$
$$F(x):=\sum_{k\in \mathbb{N}} e^{-\sqrt{2^k}}\cos\left(2^k x\right)\ .$$

Since the series $\sum_{k\in \mathbb{N}} e^{-\sqrt{2^k}} \left(2^k\right)^n$ converges for all $n \in \mathbb{N}$, this function is easily seen to be of class C^{∞}, by a standard inductive application of the Weierstrass M-test to demonstrate uniform convergence of each series of derivatives.

We now show that $F(x)$ is not analytic at any dyadic rational multiple of π, that is, at any $x := \pi \cdot p \cdot 2^{-q}$ with $p \in \mathbb{Z}$ and $q \in \mathbb{N}$. Since the sum of the first $q$ terms is analytic, we need only consider $F_{>q}(x)$, the sum of the terms with $k>q$. For all orders of derivation $n = 2^m$ with $m \in \mathbb{N}$, $m \geq 2$ and $m > q/2$ we have
$$F_{>q}^{(n)}(x):=\sum_{k\in \mathbb{N}\atop k>q} e^{-\sqrt{2^k}} \left(2^k\right)^n \cos\left(2^k x\right)  = \sum_{k\in \mathbb{N}\atop k>q} e^{-\sqrt{2^k}} \left(2^k\right)^n \ge  e^{-n} n^{2n}\quad  (\mathrm{as}\; n\to \infty)$$
where we used the fact that $\cos\left(2^k x\right) = 1$ for all $2^k > 2^q$, and we bounded the first sum from below by the term with $2^k=2^{2m}=n^2$. As a consequence, at any such $x \in \mathbb{R}$
$$\limsup_{n\to\infty} \left(\frac{\left|F_{>q}^{(n)}(x)\right|}{n!}\right)^{1/n}=+\infty\, ,$$
so that the radius of convergence of the Taylor series of $F_{>q}$ at $x$ is 0 by the Cauchy-Hadamard formula. Since the set of analyticity of a function is an open set, and since dyadic rationals are dense, we conclude that $F_{>q}$, and hence $F$, is nowhere analytic in $\mathbb{R}$.

== Application to Taylor series ==
For every sequence α_{0}, α_{1}, α_{2}, ... of real or complex numbers, the following construction shows the existence of a smooth function F on the real line which has these numbers as derivatives at the origin. In particular, every sequence of numbers can appear as the coefficients of the Taylor series of a smooth function. This result is known as Borel's lemma, after Émile Borel.

With the smooth transition function g as above, define
$$h(x)=g(2+x)\,g(2-x),\qquad x\in\mathbb{R}.$$

This function h is also smooth; it equals 1 on the closed interval [−1,1] and vanishes outside the open interval (−2,2). Using h, define for every natural number n (including zero) the smooth function
$$\psi_n(x)=x^n\,h(x),\qquad x\in\mathbb{R},$$
which agrees with the monomial x^{n} on [−1,1] and vanishes outside the interval (−2,2). Hence, the k-th derivative of ψ_{n} at the origin satisfies
$$\psi_n^{(k)}(0)=\begin{cases}n!&\text{if }k=n,\\0&\text{otherwise,}\end{cases}\quad k,n\in\mathbb{N}_0,$$
and the boundedness theorem implies that ψ_{n} and every derivative of ψ_{n} is bounded. Therefore, the constants
$$\lambda_n=\max\left\{1, \left|\alpha_n\right|, \left\|\psi_n\right\|_\infty, \left\|\psi_n^{(1)}\right\|_\infty, \ldots, \left\|\psi_n^{(n)}\right\|_\infty\right\},\qquad n\in\mathbb{N}_0,$$
involving the supremum norm of ψ_{n} and its first n derivatives, are well-defined real numbers. Define the scaled functions
$$f_n(x)=\frac{\alpha_n}{n!\,\lambda_n^n}\psi_n(\lambda_n x),\qquad n\in\mathbb{N}_0,\;x\in\mathbb{R}.$$

By repeated application of the chain rule,
$$f_n^{(k)}(x)=\frac{\alpha_n}{n!\,\lambda_n^{n-k}}\psi_n^{(k)}(\lambda_n x),\qquad k,n\in\mathbb{N}_0,\;x\in\mathbb{R},$$
and, using the previous result for the k-th derivative of ψ_{n} at zero,
$$f_n^{(k)}(0)=\begin{cases}\alpha_n&\text{if }k=n,\\0&\text{otherwise,}\end{cases}\qquad k,n\in\mathbb{N}_0.$$

It remains to show that the function
$$F(x)=\sum_{n=0}^\infty f_n(x),\qquad x\in\mathbb{R},$$
is well defined and can be differentiated term-by-term infinitely many times. To this end, observe that for every k
$$\sum_{n=0}^\infty \left\|f_n^{(k)}\right\|_\infty
\le \sum_{n=0}^{k+1}\frac{|\alpha_n|}{n!\,\lambda_n^{n-k}} \left\|\psi_n^{(k)}\right\|_\infty
+\sum_{n=k+2}^\infty\frac1{n!}
\underbrace{\frac1{\lambda_n^{n-k-2}}}_{\le\,1}
\underbrace{\frac{|\alpha_n|}{\lambda_n}}_{\le\,1}
\underbrace{\frac{\left\|\psi_n^{(k)}\right\|_\infty}{\lambda_n}}_{\le\,1}
<\infty,$$
where the remaining infinite series converges by the ratio test.

== Application to higher dimensions ==
The function Ψ_{1}(x) in one dimension.

For every radius r > 0,
$$\mathbb{R}^n\ni x\mapsto \Psi_r(x)=f\left(r^2-\|x\|^2\right)$$
with Euclidean norm ‖x‖ defines a smooth function on n-dimensional Euclidean space with support in the ball of radius r, but $\Psi_r(0)>0$.

== Complex analysis ==
This pathology cannot occur with differentiable functions of a complex variable rather than of a real variable. Indeed, all holomorphic functions are analytic, so that the failure of the function f defined in this article to be analytic in spite of its being infinitely differentiable is an indication of one of the most dramatic differences between real-variable and complex-variable analysis.

Note that although the function f has derivatives of all orders over the real line, the analytic continuation of f from the positive half-line x > 0 to the complex plane, that is, the function
$$\mathbb{C}\setminus\{0\}\ni z\mapsto e^{-\frac{1}{z}}\in\mathbb{C},$$
has an essential singularity at the origin, and hence is not even continuous, much less analytic. By the great Picard theorem, it attains every complex value (with the exception of zero) infinitely many times in every neighbourhood of the origin.

== See also ==
- Bump function
- Fabius function
- Flat function
- Mollifier
