= Borel's lemma =

Result used in the theory of asymptotic expansions and partial differential equations

In mathematics, Borel's lemma, named after Émile Borel, is an important result used in the theory of asymptotic expansions and partial differential equations.

== Statement ==
Suppose U is an open set in the Euclidean space R^{n}, and suppose that f_{0}, f_{1}, ... is a sequence of smooth functions on U.

If I is any open interval in R containing 0 (possibly I = R), then there exists a smooth function F(t, x) defined on I×U, such that

$$\left.\frac{\partial^k F}{\partial t^k}\right|_{(0,x)} = f_k(x),$$

for k ≥ 0 and x in U.

== Proof ==
Proofs of Borel's lemma can be found in many text books on analysis, including Golubitsky & Guillemin (1974) and Hörmander (1990), from which the proof below is taken.

Note that it suffices to prove the result for a small interval I = (−ε,ε), since if ψ(t) is a smooth bump function with compact support in (−ε,ε) equal identically to 1 near 0, then ψ(t) ⋅ F(t, x) gives a solution on R × U. Similarly using a smooth partition of unity on R^{n} subordinate to a covering by open balls with centres at δ⋅Z^{n}, it can be assumed that all the f_{m} have compact support in some fixed closed ball C. For each m, let

$$F_m(t,x)={t^m\over m!} \cdot \psi\left({t\over \varepsilon_m}\right)\cdot f_m(x),$$

where ε_{m} is chosen sufficiently small that

$$\|\partial^\alpha F_m \|_\infty \le 2^{-m}$$

for |α| < m. These estimates imply that each sum

$$\sum_{m\ge 0} \partial^\alpha F_m$$

is uniformly convergent and hence that

$$F=\sum_{m\ge 0} F_m$$

is a smooth function with

$$\partial^\alpha F=\sum_{m\ge 0} \partial^\alpha F_m.$$

By construction

$$\partial_t^m F(t,x)|_{t=0}=f_m(x).$$

Note: Exactly the same construction can be applied, without the auxiliary space U, to produce a smooth function on the interval I for which the derivatives at 0 form an arbitrary sequence.

== See also ==
- Non-analytic smooth function § Application to Taylor series
