= Mollifier =

Integration kernels for smoothing out sharp features

A mollifier (top) in dimension one. At the bottom, in red is a function with a corner (left) and sharp jump (right), and in blue is its mollified version.

In mathematics, mollifiers (also known as approximations to the identity) are particular smooth functions, used for example in distribution theory to create sequences of smooth functions approximating nonsmooth (generalized) functions, via convolution. Intuitively, given a (generalized) function, convolving it with a mollifier "mollifies" it, that is, its sharp features are smoothed, while still remaining close to the original.

They are also known as Friedrichs mollifiers after Kurt Otto Friedrichs, who introduced them.

== Historical notes ==
Mollifiers were introduced by Kurt Otto Friedrichs in his paper (Friedrichs 1944, pp. 136–139), which is considered a watershed in the modern theory of partial differential equations. The name of this mathematical object has a curious genesis, and Peter Lax tells the story in his commentary on that paper published in Friedrichs' "Selecta". According to him, at that time, the mathematician Donald Alexander Flanders was a colleague of Friedrichs; since he liked to consult colleagues about English usage, he asked Flanders for advice on naming the smoothing operator he was using. Flanders was a modern-day puritan, nicknamed by his friends Moll after Moll Flanders in recognition of his moral qualities: he suggested calling the new mathematical concept a "mollifier" as a pun incorporating both Flanders' nickname and the verb 'to mollify', meaning 'to smooth over' in a figurative sense.

Previously, Sergei Sobolev had used mollifiers in his epoch making 1938 paper, which contains the proof of the Sobolev embedding theorem: Friedrichs himself acknowledged Sobolev's work on mollifiers, stating "These mollifiers were introduced by Sobolev and the author...".

It must be pointed out that the term "mollifier" has undergone linguistic drift since the time of these foundational works: Friedrichs defined as "mollifier" the integral operator whose kernel is one of the functions nowadays called mollifiers. However, since the properties of a linear integral operator are completely determined by its kernel, the name mollifier was inherited by the kernel itself as a result of common usage.

== Definition ==
A function undergoing progressive mollification.

=== Modern (distribution based) definition ===
Definition 1. Let $\varphi$ be a smooth function on $\R^n$, $n \ge 1$, and put $\varphi_\epsilon(x) := \epsilon^{-n}\varphi(x / \epsilon)$ for $\epsilon > 0 \in\R$. Then $\varphi$ is a mollifier if it satisfies the following three requirements:

(1) it is compactly supported,
(2) $\int_{\R^n}\!\varphi(x)\mathrm{d}x=1$,
(3) $\lim_{\epsilon\to 0}\varphi_\epsilon(x) = \lim_{\epsilon\to 0}\epsilon^{-n}\varphi(x / \epsilon)=\delta(x)$,

where $\delta(x)$ is the Dirac delta function, and the limit must be understood as taking place in the space of Schwartz distributions. The function $\varphi$ may also satisfy further conditions of interest; for example, if it satisfies

(4) $\varphi(x)\ge 0$ for all $x \in \R^n$,

then it is called a positive mollifier, and if it satisfies

(5) $\varphi(x)=\mu(|x|)$ for some infinitely differentiable function $\mu:\R^+\to\R$,

then it is called a symmetric mollifier.

=== Notes on Friedrichs' definition ===
Note 1. When the theory of distributions was still not widely known nor used, property (3) above was formulated by saying that the convolution of the function $\scriptstyle\varphi_\epsilon$ with a given function belonging to a proper Hilbert or Banach space will converge, in the metric of that space, as ε → 0 to that function: this is exactly what Friedrichs did. This also clarifies why mollifiers are related to approximate identities.

Note 2. As briefly pointed out in the "Historical notes" section of this entry, originally, the term "mollifier" identified the following convolution operator:

$$\Phi_\epsilon(f)(x)=\int_{\mathbb{R}^n}\varphi_\epsilon(x-y) f(y)\mathrm{d}y$$

where $\varphi_\epsilon(x)=\epsilon^{-n}\varphi(x/\epsilon)$ and $\varphi$ is a smooth function satisfying the first three conditions stated above and one or more supplementary conditions as positivity and symmetry.

== Concrete example ==
Consider the bump function $\varphi$$(x)$ of a variable in $\mathbb{R}^n$ defined by

$$\varphi(x) = \begin{cases} e^{-1/(1-|x|^2)}/I_n& \text{ if } |x| < 1\\
0& \text{ if } |x|\geq 1
\end{cases}$$

where the numerical constant $I_n$ ensures normalization. This function is infinitely differentiable, non analytic with vanishing derivative for |x| = 1. $\varphi$ can be therefore used as mollifier as described above: one can see that $\varphi$$(x)$ defines a positive and symmetric mollifier.

The function $\varphi$$(x)$ in dimension one

== Properties ==
All properties of a mollifier are related to its behaviour under the operation of convolution: we list the following ones, whose proofs can be found in every text on distribution theory.

=== Smoothing property ===
For any distribution $T$, the following family of convolutions indexed by the real number $\epsilon$

$$T_\epsilon = T\ast\varphi_\epsilon$$

where $\ast$ denotes convolution, is a family of smooth functions.

=== Approximation of identity ===
For any distribution $T$, the following family of convolutions indexed by the real number $\epsilon$ converges to $T$

$$\lim_{\epsilon\to 0}T_\epsilon = \lim_{\epsilon\to 0}T\ast\varphi_\epsilon=T\in D^\prime(\mathbb{R}^n)$$

=== Support of convolution ===
For any distribution $T$,

$$\operatorname{supp}T_\epsilon=\operatorname{supp}(T\ast\varphi_\epsilon)\subset\operatorname{supp}T+\operatorname{supp}\varphi_\epsilon$$,

where $\operatorname{supp}$ indicates the support in the sense of distributions, and $+$ indicates their Minkowski addition.

== Applications ==
The basic application of mollifiers is to prove that properties valid for smooth functions are also valid in nonsmooth situations.

=== Product of distributions ===
In some theories of generalized functions, mollifiers are used to define the multiplication of distributions. Given two distributions $S$ and $T$, the limit of the product of the smooth function obtained from one operand via mollification, with the other operand defines, when it exists, their product in various theories of generalized functions:

$$S\cdot T := \lim_{\epsilon\to 0}S_\epsilon\cdot T=\lim_{\epsilon\to 0}S\cdot T_\epsilon$$.

=== "Weak=Strong" theorems ===
Mollifiers are used to prove the identity of two different kind of extension of differential operators: the strong extension and the weak extension. The paper by Friedrichs which introduces mollifiers (Friedrichs 1944) illustrates this approach.

=== Smooth cutoff functions ===
By convolution of the characteristic function of the unit ball $B_1 = \{x : |x|<1\}$ with the smooth function $\varphi_{1/2}$ (defined as in (3) with $\epsilon = 1/2$), one obtains the function

$$\begin{align}
\chi_{B_1,1/2}(x)
&=\chi_{B_1}\ast\varphi_{1/2}(x)
\\
&=\int_{\mathbb{R}^n}\!\!\!\chi_{B_1}(x-y)\varphi_{1/2}(y)\mathrm{d}y
\\
&=\int_{B_{1/2}}\!\!\!
\chi_{B_1}(x-y) \varphi_{1/2}(y)\mathrm{d}y \ \ \ (\because\ \mathrm{supp}(\varphi_{1/2})=B_{1/2})
\end{align}$$

which is a smooth function equal to $1$ on $B_{1/2} = \{ x: |x| < 1/2 \}$, with support contained in $B_{3/2}=\{ x: |x| < 3/2 \}$. This can be seen easily by observing that if $|x| \le 1/2$ and $|y| \le 1/2$ then $|x-y| \le 1$. Hence for $|x| \le 1/2$,

$$\int_{B_{1/2}}\!\!\!\chi_{B_1}(x-y) \varphi_{1/2}(y)\mathrm{d}y= \int_{B_{1/2}}\!\!\!
\varphi_{1/2}(y)\mathrm{d}y=1$$.

One can see how this construction can be generalized to obtain a smooth function identical to one on a neighbourhood of a given compact set, and equal to zero in every point whose distance from this set is greater than a given $\epsilon$. Such a function is called a (smooth) cutoff function; these are used to eliminate singularities of a given (generalized) function via multiplication. They leave unchanged the value of the multiplicand on a given set, but modify its support. Cutoff functions are used to construct smooth partitions of unity.

== See also ==
- Approximate identity
- Bump function
- Convolution
- Distribution (mathematics)
- Generalized function
- Kurt Otto Friedrichs
- Non-analytic smooth function
- Sergei Sobolev
- Weierstrass transform
