= Smoothness =

Degree of differentiability of a function or map

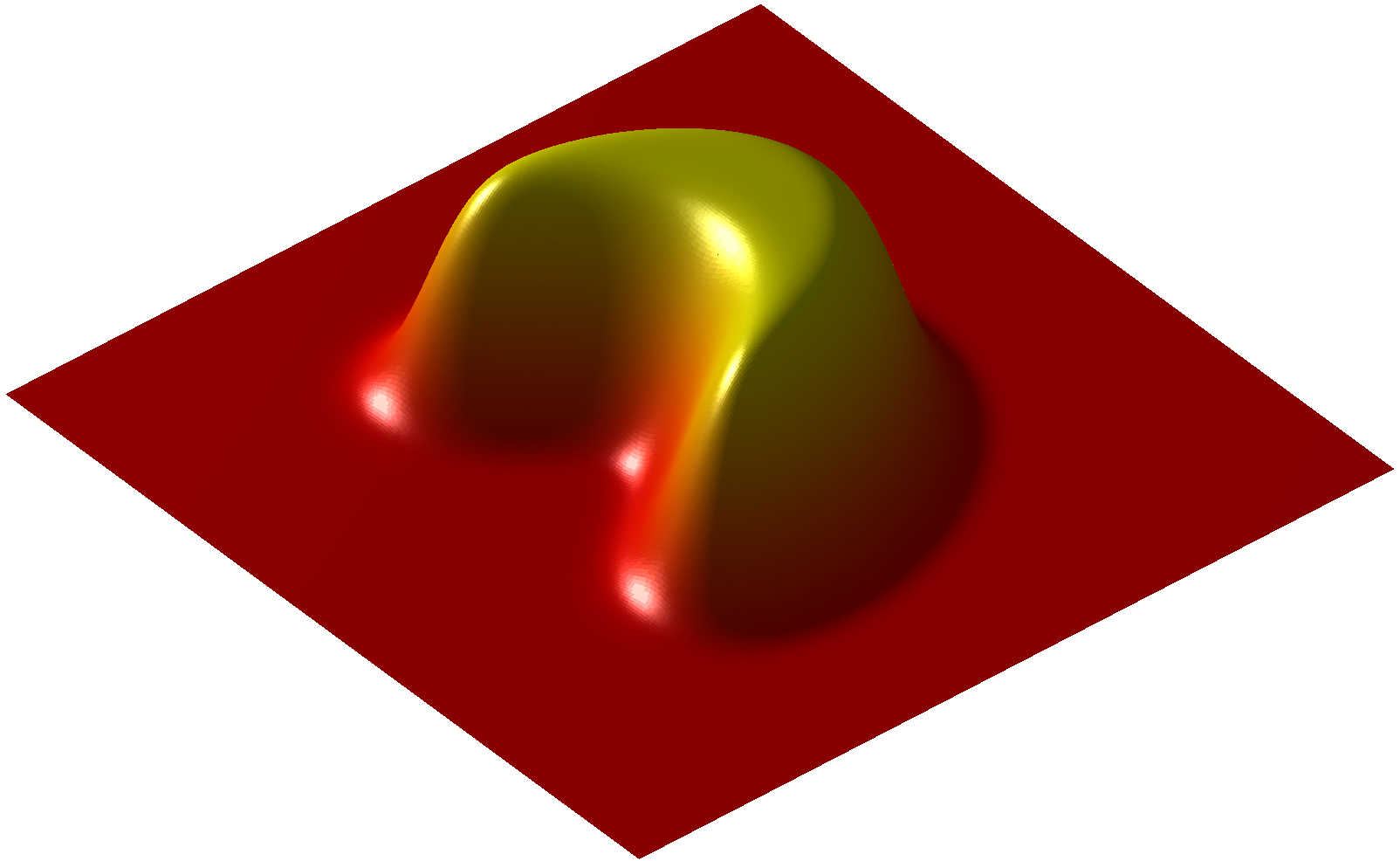
A bump function is a smooth function with compact support.

In calculus and mathematical analysis, the smoothness of a function describes the number of times it can be differentiated without producing discontinuities. The smoothness, or differentiability class, is an integer $k$ such that a function has all derivatives up to order $k$, and such that all of these derivatives are continuous. One says that such a function has class $C^k$. For example, the absolute value function $f(x)=|x|$ has class $C^0$, because it is continuous, but not differentiable. Generally, the term smooth function refers to a $C^{\infty}$-function, that is a function having derivatives of all orders. However, it may also mean "sufficiently differentiable" for the problem under consideration.

The usual definition is local and is therefore first made for functions defined on open subsets of Euclidean space. For functions on closed intervals, closures of open sets, or more general subsets, the same notation is also used, but its meaning depends on an additional convention, such as requiring derivatives to extend continuously to the boundary or requiring the function to be locally the restriction of a smooth function defined on an open neighborhood.

Differentiability classes are used in mathematical analysis to describe different degrees of regularity for partial differential equations. They are used in differential topology to define different classes of differentiable manifolds. For complex-valued functions, one may still speak of $C^k$ or $C^\infty$ smoothness by regarding the function as a map between real vector spaces. This should be distinguished from complex differentiability: a complex function that is complex differentiable on an open subset of $\mathbb C$ is holomorphic and hence analytic on that set.

== Differentiability classes ==
Differentiability class is a classification of functions according to the highest order of derivative that exists and is continuous for a function.

Consider an open set $U$ on the real line and a function $f$ defined on $U$ with real values. Let k be a non-negative integer. The function $f$ is said to be of differentiability class $C^k$ if the derivatives $f',f'',\dots,f^{(k)}$ exist and are continuous on $U.$ If $f$ is of class $C^k$ on $U$ and $k>0$, then it is also of class $C^{k-1}$. The function $f$ is said to be infinitely differentiable, smooth, or of class $C^\infty,$ if it is of class $C^k$ for every non-negative integer $k$. The function $f$ is said to be of class $C^\omega,$ or analytic, if $f$ is smooth and its Taylor series expansion around any point in its domain converges to the function in some neighborhood of the point. There exist functions that are smooth but not analytic; $C^\omega$ is thus strictly contained in $C^\infty.$ Bump functions are examples of functions with this property.

To put it differently, the class $C^0$ consists of all continuous functions. The class $C^1$ consists of all differentiable functions whose derivative is continuous; such functions are called continuously differentiable. Thus, a $C^1$ function is exactly a function whose derivative exists and is of class $C^0.$ For functions of one real variable, the classes $C^k$ can be defined recursively by declaring $C^0$ to be the set of all continuous functions, and declaring $C^k$ for any positive integer $k$ to be the set of all differentiable functions whose derivative is in $C^{k-1}.$ In particular, $C^k$ is contained in $C^{k-1}$ for every $k>0,$ and there are examples to show that this containment is strict ($C^k \subsetneq C^{k-1}$). The class $C^\infty$ of infinitely differentiable functions is the intersection of the classes $C^k$ as $k$ varies over the non-negative integers.

=== Examples ===
==== Continuous (C^{0}) but not differentiable ====
The C^{0} function f(x) = x for x ≥ 0 and 0 otherwise.

The function g(x) = x^{2} sin(1/x) for x > 0.

The function $f:\R\to\R$ with $f(x)=x^2\sin\left(\tfrac 1x\right)$ for $x\neq 0$ and $f(0)=0$ is differentiable. However, this function is not continuously differentiable.

A smooth function that is not analytic.

The function
$$f(x) = \begin{cases}x  & \mbox{if } x \geq 0, \\ 0 &\text{if } x < 0\end{cases}$$
is continuous, but not differentiable at x = 0, so it is of class C^{0}, but not of class C^{1}.

==== Finitely differentiable functions ====
For each even non-negative integer k, the function
$$f(x)=|x|^{k+1}$$
is continuous and of class $C^k$. At x = 0, however, $f$ is not of class $C^{k+1}$, so $f$ is of class C^{k}, but not of class C^{j} where j > k.

==== Differentiable but not continuously differentiable (not C^{1}) ====
The function
$$g(x) = \begin{cases}x^2\sin{\left(\tfrac{1}{x}\right)} & \text{if }x \neq 0, \\ 0 &\text{if }x = 0\end{cases}$$
is differentiable, with derivative
$$g'(x) = \begin{cases}-\mathord{\cos\left(\tfrac{1}{x}\right)} + 2x\sin\left(\tfrac{1}{x}\right) & \text{if }x \neq 0, \\ 0 &\text{if }x = 0.\end{cases}$$

Because $\cos(1/x)$ oscillates as x → 0, $g'(x)$ is not continuous at zero. Therefore, $g(x)$ is differentiable but not of class C^{1}.

==== Differentiable but not Lipschitz continuous ====
The function
$$h(x) = \begin{cases}x^{4/3}\sin{\left(\tfrac{1}{x}\right)} & \text{if }x \neq 0, \\ 0 &\text{if }x = 0\end{cases}$$
is differentiable, but its derivative is unbounded on every compact interval containing $0$. Therefore, $h$ is an example of a differentiable function that is not locally Lipschitz continuous at $0$.

==== Analytic (C^{ω}) ====
The exponential function $e^{x}$ is analytic, and hence falls into the class C^{ω}. The trigonometric functions are also analytic wherever they are defined, because they are linear combinations of complex exponential functions $e^{ix}$ and $e^{-ix}$.

==== Smooth (C^{∞}) but not analytic (C^{ω}) ====
The bump function
$$f(x) = \begin{cases}e^{-\frac{1}{1-x^2}} & \text{ if } |x| < 1, \\ 0 &\text{ otherwise }\end{cases}$$
is smooth, so of class C^{∞}, but it is not analytic at x = ±1, and hence is not of class C^{ω}. The function f is an example of a smooth function with compact support.

=== Multivariate differentiability classes ===
A function $f:U\subseteq\mathbb{R}^n\to\mathbb{R}$ defined on an open set $U$ of $\mathbb{R}^n$ is said to be of class $C^k$ on $U$, for a positive integer $k$, if all partial derivatives
$$D^\alpha f=\frac{\partial^{|\alpha|} f}{\partial x_1^{\alpha_1} \, \partial x_2^{\alpha_2}\,\cdots\,\partial x_n^{\alpha_n}}$$
exist and are continuous for every multi-index $\alpha=(\alpha_1,\alpha_2,\ldots,\alpha_n)$ of non-negative integers with $|\alpha|=\alpha_1+\alpha_2+\cdots+\alpha_n\leq k$. Equivalently, in finite dimensions, $f$ is of class $C^k$ on $U$ if it is $k$ times continuously Fréchet differentiable on $U$. The function $f$ is said to be of class $C$ or $C^0$ if it is continuous on $U$. Functions of class $C^1$ are also said to be continuously differentiable.

A function $f:U\subset\mathbb{R}^n\to\mathbb{R}^m$, defined on an open set $U$ of $\mathbb{R}^n$, is said to be of class $C^k$ on $U$, for a positive integer $k$, if all of its components
$$f_i=\pi_i\circ f \quad \text{for } i=1,2,3,\ldots,m$$
are of class $C^k$, where $\pi_i$ are the natural projections $\pi_i:\mathbb{R}^m\to\mathbb{R}$ defined by $\pi_i(x_1,x_2,\ldots,x_m)=x_i$. It is said to be of class $C$ or $C^0$ if it is continuous, or equivalently, if all components $f_i$ are continuous, on $U$.

== Function spaces ==
=== Open domains ===
Let $D$ be an open subset of $\mathbb R^n$. The set of all real-valued $C^k$ functions on $D$ is denoted $C^k(D)$. With the compact-open $C^k$ topology, $C^k(D)$ is a Fréchet space. One way to describe this topology is by the family of seminorms
$$p_{K,\alpha}(f)=\sup_{x\in K}|D^\alpha f(x)|,$$
where $K$ ranges over compact subsets of $D$ and $\alpha$ ranges over multi-indices with $|\alpha|\leq k$.

=== Compact domains ===
If $U\subset \mathbb R^n$ is bounded and open, then $C^k(\overline U)$ denotes the space of functions on $U$ whose partial derivatives of order at most $k$ extend continuously to the compact set $\overline U$. It is a Banach space with the norm
$$\|f\|_{C^k(\overline U)}
=
\max_{|\alpha|\leq k}\sup_{x\in \overline U}|D^\alpha f(x)|.$$
Equivalently, one may use the sum of these suprema over $|\alpha|\leq k$; the resulting norm is equivalent.

Under pointwise addition and multiplication, $C^k(\overline U)$ is a commutative Banach algebra. The algebra property follows from the Leibniz rule, which expresses each derivative of a product in terms of derivatives of the factors of order at most $k$.

More generally, if $M$ is a compact smooth manifold, possibly with boundary, then $C^k(M)$ is a Banach space. Its norm may be defined using a finite collection of coordinate charts and a partition of unity; different such choices give equivalent norms. With pointwise multiplication, $C^k(M)$ is again a Banach algebra. By contrast, $C^\infty(M)$ is generally not a Banach space; on a compact manifold it is naturally a Fréchet space, with seminorms controlling derivatives of all orders.

The Gelfand spectrum of $C^k(M)$ is $M$ itself. Thus the Gelfand transform gives an injective (but not surjective) map $C^k(M)\to C^0(M)$.

=== Density ===
The above spaces occur naturally in applications where functions having derivatives of certain orders are necessary; however, particularly in the study of partial differential equations, it can sometimes be more fruitful to work instead with Sobolev spaces.

Smooth compactly supported functions are dense in many function spaces used in analysis, such as $L^p$ spaces and Sobolev spaces under suitable hypotheses. These correspond to putting topologies on the smooth functions that are weaker than those of uniform convergence (like the $L^p$ norm). This makes smooth functions useful as test functions and as approximations to less regular functions.

== Basic properties ==
The differentiability classes $C^k$ are closed under the usual algebraic operations. If $f$ and $g$ are real-valued functions of class $C^k$ on the same domain, then $f+g$, $fg$, and any scalar multiple of $f$ are also of class $C^k$. If $g$ is nowhere zero, then the quotient $f/g$ is of class $C^k$. These facts follow from the sum, product, and quotient rules for derivatives. Moreover, the space $C^k(U)$ is a real vector space and, under pointwise multiplication, a commutative algebra. In particular, $C^\infty(M)$, the algebra of smooth real-valued functions on a smooth manifold $M$, plays a central role in differential geometry: many geometric objects on $M$ can be described in terms of their action on smooth functions.

The class $C^k$ is also closed under composition. If $U,V,W$ are open subsets of Euclidean spaces, $f:U\to V$ is of class $C^k$, and $g:V\to W$ is of class $C^k$, then the composite map $g\circ f:U\to W$ is of class $C^k$. For $k=1$, this is a consequence of the chain rule:
$$D(g\circ f)(x)=Dg(f(x))\circ Df(x).$$
The higher-order case follows by repeated differentiation.

The classes form a nested hierarchy:
$$C^\infty \subseteq \cdots \subseteq C^{k+1}\subseteq C^k\subseteq\cdots\subseteq C^1\subseteq C^0.$$
Thus every $C^{k+1}$ function is $C^k$, and every $C^1$ function is continuous. On typical domains, such as open intervals or open subsets of Euclidean space, these inclusions are strict.

In several variables, continuous differentiability has several consequences for partial derivatives. If a function is of class $C^k$, then its mixed partial derivatives of order at most $k$ are independent of the order of differentiation. In particular, if $f$ is of class $C^2$, then
$$\frac{\partial^2 f}{\partial x_i\,\partial x_j}
=
\frac{\partial^2 f}{\partial x_j\,\partial x_i}$$
for all coordinate directions $x_i$ and $x_j$. As a consequence, the hessian matrix of a $C^2$ function is a symmetric matrix.

The class $C^1$ is a hypothesis in local results such as the inverse function theorem and the implicit function theorem. For example, if $f:U\subseteq\mathbb R^n\to\mathbb R^n$ is of class $C^1$ and the derivative $Df(a)$ is invertible at a point $a\in U$, then $f$ is locally invertible near $a$, and its local inverse is also of class $C^1$.

== Other concepts ==
=== Relation to analyticity ===
While all analytic functions are smooth on the set on which they are analytic, examples such as bump functions (mentioned above) show that the converse is not true for functions on the reals: there exist smooth real functions that are not analytic. Simple examples of functions that are smooth but not analytic at any point can be made by means of Fourier series; another example is the Fabius function. Although it might seem that such functions are the exception rather than the rule, analytic functions form a small subclass of smooth functions; for example, with suitable topologies on spaces of smooth functions, analytic functions form a meagre subset of the smooth functions. Furthermore, for every open subset A of the real line, there exist smooth functions that are analytic on A and nowhere else.

The situation thus described is in marked contrast to complex differentiable functions. If a complex function is holomorphic on an open set, it is infinitely differentiable and analytic on that set.

A theorem of Émile Borel states that every formal power series occurs as the Taylor series of some smooth function. This is another way in which smooth functions differ from analytic functions, whose Taylor series determine them locally.

=== Smoothness and the Fourier transform ===
Under suitable hypotheses, higher differentiability of a function is related to faster decay of its Laplace transform or Fourier transform. For example, integration by parts gives decay estimates for Fourier transforms of functions whose derivatives satisfy appropriate integrability or boundary conditions. These relationships are related to results such as the Paley–Wiener theorem.

Conversely, decay of the Fourier transform can imply differentiability or continuity properties of the original function. This is often formulated using Sobolev spaces: Fourier-transform decay gives Sobolev regularity, and the Sobolev embedding theorem gives conditions under which Sobolev regularity implies classical $C^k$ smoothness.

=== Test functions and distributions ===
Smooth compactly supported functions, usually denoted $C_c^\infty(U)$, are called test functions. They are used to define distributions and weak derivatives.

=== Smooth partitions of unity ===
Smooth functions with suitably controlled support, especially smooth functions with compact support, are used in the construction of smooth partitions of unity (see partition of unity and topology glossary); these are essential in the study of smooth manifolds, for example to show that Riemannian metrics can be defined globally starting from their local existence. A simple case is that of a bump function on the real line, that is, a smooth function f that takes the value 0 outside an interval [a,b] and such that
$$f(x) > 0 \quad \text{ for } \quad a < x < b.\,$$

Given a locally finite collection of overlapping intervals on the line, bump functions can be constructed on each of them, and on semi-infinite intervals $(-\infty, c]$ and $[d, +\infty)$ to cover the whole line, such that the sum of the functions is always 1.

From what has just been said, partitions of unity do not apply to holomorphic functions in the same way; for example, there are no nonzero holomorphic functions with compact support on a connected complex domain. Their different behavior relative to existence and analytic continuation is one of the roots of sheaf theory. In contrast, sheaves of smooth functions are fine and hence have different cohomological behavior.

=== Smooth functions on and between manifolds ===
Given a smooth manifold $M$, of dimension $m,$ and an atlas $\mathfrak{U} = \{(U_\alpha,\phi_\alpha)\}_\alpha,$ a map $f:M\to \R$ is smooth on $M$ if, for every $p \in M$, there is a chart $(U, \phi) \in \mathfrak{U},$ with $p \in U,$ such that $f \circ \phi^{-1} : \phi(U) \to \R$ is a smooth function from the open subset $\phi(U)$ of $\R^m$ to $\R$. Similarly, $f$ is of class $C^k$ if these coordinate representations are of class $C^k$. Smoothness can be checked with respect to any chart of the atlas that contains $p,$ since the smoothness requirements on the transition functions between charts ensure that if $f$ is smooth near $p$ in one chart it will be smooth near $p$ in any other chart.

On a smooth manifold $M$, smooth vector fields can be identified with derivations of the algebra $C^\infty(M)$. That is, a vector field $X$ acts on smooth functions by $f\mapsto Xf$ and satisfies the Leibniz rule
$$X(fg)=fX(g)+gX(f).$$

If $F : M \to N$ is a map from $M$ to an $n$-dimensional manifold $N$, then $F$ is smooth if, for every $p \in M,$ there is a chart $(U,\phi)$ containing $p,$ and a chart $(V, \psi)$ containing $F(p)$ such that $F(U) \subset V,$ and $\psi \circ F \circ \phi^{-1} : \phi(U) \to \psi(V)$ is a smooth function between open subsets of Euclidean spaces.

Smooth maps between manifolds induce linear maps between tangent spaces: for $F : M \to N$, at each point the pushforward (or differential) maps tangent vectors at $p$ to tangent vectors at $F(p)$: $F_{*,p} : T_p M \to T_{F(p)}N,$ and on the level of the tangent bundle, the pushforward is a vector bundle homomorphism: $F_* : TM \to TN.$ The dual to the pushforward is the pullback, which "pulls" covectors on $N$ back to covectors on $M,$ and $k$-forms to $k$-forms: $F^* : \Omega^k(N) \to \Omega^k(M).$ In this way smooth functions between manifolds can transport local data, like vector fields and differential forms, from one manifold to another, or down to Euclidean space where computations like integration are well understood.

Preimages and images of smooth maps are, in general, not manifolds without additional assumptions. Preimages of regular values are manifolds; this means that, for a smooth map $F:M\to N$ and a value $q\in N$, the differential $dF_p:T_pM\to T_qN$ is surjective at every point $p\in F^{-1}(q)$. This is the preimage theorem. Similarly, the image of an embedding is an embedded submanifold.

Smoothness is also defined for sections of vector bundles. A section is smooth if its coordinate components are smooth in local trivializations. Smooth vector fields, differential forms, and tensor fields are examples of smooth sections.

=== Smooth functions between subsets of manifolds ===
There is a corresponding notion of smooth map for arbitrary subsets of manifolds. If $f : X \to Y$ is a function whose domain and codomain are subsets of manifolds $X \subseteq M$ and $Y \subseteq N$, respectively, then $f$ is said to be smooth if for all $x \in X$ there is an open set $U \subseteq M$ with $x \in U$ and a smooth function $F : U \to N$ such that $F(p) = f(p)$ for all $p \in U \cap X.$

=== Hölder spaces ===
For $0<\alpha\le 1$, the Hölder spaces $C^{k,\alpha}(U)$ on an open set $U$ in $\mathbb R^n$ are functions that are $C^k$ on $U$ and whose $k$-th partials satisfy a Hölder condition on $U$:
$$|\partial^k f(x) - \partial^k f(y)| \le C\|x-y\|^\alpha.$$
This condition is stronger than ordinary continuity. When $\alpha=1$, it implies the Lipschitz continuity of the k-th derivative, which is weaker than their differentiability. Thus, for $0<\alpha<1$, and on a non-empty open domain $U$,
$$C^{k+1}(U) \subsetneq C^{k,1}(U) \subsetneq C^{k,\alpha}(U) \subsetneq C^k(U).$$

== See also ==
- Discontinuity – Mathematical analysis of discontinuous points
- Hadamard's lemma – Theorem
- Non-analytic smooth function – Mathematical functions which are smooth but not analytic
- Parametric continuity – Notion of smoothness for parametric curves
- Quasi-analytic function
- Singularity (mathematics) – Point where a mathematical object behaves irregularly
- Sinuosity – Ratio of arc length and straight-line distance between two points on a wave-like function
- Smooth scheme – Concept in algebraic geometry
- Smooth number – Integer having only small prime factors (number theory)
- Smoothing – Fitting an approximating function to data
- Spline – Mathematical function defined piecewise by polynomials
- Sobolev mapping
