= Partition of unity =

Set of functions from a topological space to [0,1] which sum to 1 for any input

In mathematics, a partition of unity on a topological space $X$ is a set $R$ of continuous functions from $X$ to the unit interval [0,1] such that for every point $x\in X$:

- there is a neighbourhood of $x$ where all but a finite number of the functions of $R$ are zero, and
- the sum of all the function values at $x$ is 1, i.e., $\sum_{\rho\in R} \rho(x) = 1.$

A partition of unity on a circle with four functions. The circle is unrolled to a line segment (the bottom solid line) for graphing purposes. The dashed line on top is the sum of the functions in the partition.

Partitions of unity are useful because they often allow one to extend local constructions to the whole space. They are also important in the interpolation of data, in signal processing, and the theory of spline functions.

== Existence ==
The existence of partitions of unity assumes two distinct forms:

1. Given any open cover $\{ U_i \}_{i \in I}$ of a space, there exists a partition of unity $\{ \rho_i \}_{i \in I}$ indexed over the same set $I$ such that supp $\rho_i \subseteq U_i.$ Such a partition is said to be subordinate to the open cover $\{ U_i \}_i.$
2. Given any open cover $\{ U_i \}_{i \in I}$ of a locally compact space, there exists a partition of unity $\{ \rho_j \}_{j \in J}$ indexed over a possibly distinct index set $J$ such that each $\rho_j$ has compact support and for each $j \in J$ there is an $i \in I$ with supp $\rho_j \subseteq U_i$.

Thus one chooses either to have the supports indexed by the open cover, or compact supports. If the space is compact, then there exist partitions satisfying both requirements.

A finite open cover always has a continuous partition of unity subordinate to it, provided the space is locally compact and Hausdorff. Paracompactness of the space is a necessary condition to guarantee the existence of a partition of unity subordinate to any open cover. Depending on the category to which the space belongs, this may also be a sufficient condition. In particular, a compact set in the Euclidean space admits a smooth partition of unity subordinate to any finite open cover. The construction uses mollifiers (bump functions), which exist in continuous and smooth manifolds, but not necessarily in analytic manifolds. Thus for an open cover of an analytic manifold, an analytic partition of unity subordinate to that open cover generally does not exist. See analytic continuation.

If $R$ and $T$ are partitions of unity for spaces $X$ and $Y$ respectively, then the set of all pairs $\{ \rho\otimes\tau :\ \rho \in R,\ \tau \in T \}$ is a partition of unity for the cartesian product space $X \times Y$. The tensor product of functions act as $(\rho \otimes \tau )(x,y) = \rho(x)\tau(y).$

== Example ==
Let $p$ and $q$ be antipodal points on the circle $S^1$. We can construct a partition of unity on $S^1$ by looking at a chart on the complement of the point $p \in S^1$ that sends $S^1 -\{p\}$ to $\mathbb{R}$ with center $q \in S^1$. Now let $\Phi$ be a bump function on $\mathbb{R}$ defined by
$$\Phi(x) = \begin{cases}
\exp\left(\frac{1}{x^2-1}\right) & x \in (-1,1) \\
0 & \text{otherwise}
\end{cases}$$
then, both this function and $1 - \Phi$ can be extended uniquely onto $S^1$ by setting $\Phi(p) = 0$. Then, the pair of functions $\{ (S^1 - \{p\}, \Phi), (S^1 - \{q\}, 1-\Phi) \}$ forms a partition of unity over $S^1$.

== Variant definitions ==
Sometimes a less restrictive definition is used: the sum of all the function values at a particular point is only required to be positive, rather than 1, for each point in the space. However, given such a set of functions $\{ \psi_i \}_{i=1}^\infty$ one can obtain a partition of unity in the strict sense by dividing by the sum; the partition becomes $\{ \sigma^{-1}\psi_i \}_{i=1}^\infty$ where $\sigma(x) := \sum_{i=1}^\infty \psi_i(x)$, which is well defined since at each point only a finite number of terms are nonzero. Even further, some authors drop the requirement that the supports be locally finite, requiring only that $\sum_{i = 1}^\infty \psi_i(x) < \infty$ for all $x$.

In the field of operator algebras, a partition of unity is composed of projections $p_i=p_i^*=p_i^2$. In the case of $\mathrm{C}^*$-algebras, it can be shown that the entries are pairwise orthogonal:
$$p_ip_j=\delta_{i,j}p_i\qquad (p_i,\,p_j\in R).$$
Note it is not the case that in a general *-algebra that the entries of a partition of unity are pairwise orthogonal.

If $a$ is a normal element of a unital $\mathrm{C}^*$-algebra $A$, and has finite spectrum $\sigma(a)=\{\lambda_1,\dots,\lambda_N\}$, then the projections in the spectral decomposition:
$$a=\sum_{i=1}^N\lambda_i\,P_i,$$
form a partition of unity.

In the field of compact quantum groups, the rows and columns of the fundamental representation $u\in M_N(C)$ of a quantum permutation group $(C,u)$ form partitions of unity.

== Applications ==
A partition of unity can be used to define the integral (with respect to a volume form) of a function defined over a manifold: one first defines the integral of a function whose support is contained in a single coordinate patch of the manifold; then one uses a partition of unity to define the integral of an arbitrary function; finally one shows that the definition is independent of the chosen partition of unity.

A partition of unity can be used to show the existence of a Riemannian metric on an arbitrary manifold.

Method of steepest descent employs a partition of unity to construct asymptotics of integrals.

Linkwitz–Riley filter is an example of practical implementation of partition of unity to separate input signal into two output signals containing only high- or low-frequency components.

The Bernstein polynomials of a fixed degree m are a family of m+1 linearly independent single-variable polynomials that are a partition of unity for the unit interval $[0,1]$.

The weak Hilbert Nullstellensatz asserts that if $f_1,\ldots, f_r\in \C[x_1,\ldots,x_n]$ are polynomials with no common vanishing points in $\C^n$, then there are polynomials $a_1, \ldots, a_r$ with $a_1f_1+\cdots+a_r f_r = 1$. That is, $\rho_i = a_i f_i$ form a polynomial partition of unity subordinate to the Zariski-open cover $U_i = \{x\in \C^n \mid f_i(x)\neq 0\}$.

Partitions of unity are used to establish global smooth approximations for Sobolev functions in bounded domains.

== See also ==
- Smoothness § Smooth partitions of unity
- Gluing axiom
- Fine sheaf
