= Linear Algebra (book) =

1966 mathematics textbook by Serge Lang

- Author: Serge Lang
- Language: English
- Series: Undergraduate Texts in Mathematics
- Subject: Linear algebra
- Publisher: Addison-Wesley (1st ed.); Springer-Verlag (3rd ed.)
- Publication date: 1966 (1st ed.); 1987 (3rd ed.)
- Publication place: United States
- Pages: 285 (3rd ed.)
- ISBN: 978-0-387-96412-6 (3rd ed.)
- OCLC: 559341805

Linear Algebra is a 1966 mathematics textbook by Serge Lang. The third edition of 1987 covers fundamental concepts of vector spaces, matrices, linear mappings and operators, scalar products, determinants and eigenvalues. Multiple advanced topics follow such as decompositions of vector spaces under linear maps, the spectral theorem, polynomial ideals, Jordan form, convex sets and an appendix on the Iwasawa decomposition using group theory. The book has a pure, proof-heavy focus and is aimed at upper-division undergraduates who have been exposed to linear algebra in a prior course.

== Content ==
Linear Algebra is designed for a one-semester course in the undergraduate upper division. It assumes that the reader knows some linear algebra and is comfortable with at least the computational basics from a prior course, but states all definitions anew and derives every statement and proof from first principles. Meanwhile, the reader is expected to be comfortable with proofs and abstraction at an upper undergraduate level. There are rote computational exercises, especially in the beginning of the book, while most exercises are proof-based, ranging from easy to difficult. A few results depend on calculus and analysis, but neither is essential to the understanding of the text.

The third edition contains twelve chapters and two appendices. The first six chapters serve as a review of basic material about linear algebra. Chapter one begins with the axiomatic definition of a vector space over an arbitrary field, though the book's emphasis is on vector spaces over the real or complex numbers. The remaining portion of the chapter overviews essential concepts of vector spaces. The next chapter covers matrices quickly, de-emphasizing their computational methods and applications, followed by a chapter on linear maps and another chapter that relates them to matrices. The remainder of the book states theorems in both the terms of linear maps and those of matrices. Chapter five introduces notions of scalar products and orthogonality and develops hermitian products, bilinear and multilinear maps, the dual space and quadratic forms; it ends with a proof of Sylvester's law of inertia. Chapter six defines the determinant through expansion by subdeterminants, afterward proving further properties of the determinant, the uniqueness of the determinant function and other formulas for it, along with an introduction to permutations.

The latter six chapters furnish the core of "a second course in linear algebra, where the emphasis is on the various structure theorems". Chapter seven is a deeper treatment of symmetric, hermitian and orthogonal operators. Chapter eight introduces eigenvectors, eigenvalues and the characteristic polynomial. It pays attention to the case of symmetric and hermitian matrices, proves the spectral theorem and finishes with the decomposition of an orthogonal operator with respect to invariant subspaces.

The next three chapters discuss polynomials in an abstract-algebraic tone without mentioning group theory or ring theory explicitly. Chapter nine introduces polynomials briefly, and chapter ten covers triangulation, diagonalization and the Hamilton-Cayley theorem. Chapter eleven introduces the polynomial ideal as an algebraic structure, proving basic results about division and factorization before applying ideals in the decomposition of vector spaces, and ends with a proof of Schur's lemma and an explanation of the Jordan normal form. The final chapter covers basic concepts of convex sets, culminating in the Krein-Milman theorem. The first appendix is a review of complex numbers and contains a proof of the fundamental theorem of algebra. The second appendix develops the Iwasawa decomposition and other decompositions of matrix groups in ten pages with heavy use of group theory.

== Reception ==
Rami Shakarchi published a solution manual for the third edition in 1996. Professor Henry Pinkham of Columbia University repurposed Lang's book for a first undergraduate course in linear algebra and produced a commentary to supplement it.

== Sources ==
- Lajos, Sándor. "Review of Linear algebra". Mathematical Reviews. Mathematical Association of America.
- Lang, Serge (1987). Linear Algebra (3rd ed.). Springer-Verlag. doi:10.1007/978-1-4757-1949-9. ISBN 978-1-4419-3081-1.
- Pinkham, Henry C. (2013). "Commentary on Lang's Linear Algebra" (PDF). columbia.edu.
- Raman, C. V. (1966). "Review of Linear Algebra" (PDF). Current Science. 35 (24). Current Science Association: 633. JSTOR 24215283.
- Shakarchi, Rami (1996). Solutions Manual for Lang’s Linear Algebra. Springer-Verlag. doi:10.1007/978-1-4612-0755-9. ISBN 978-1-4612-0755-9.
