= Fritz Kübert =

Fritz Kübert may refer to:

- Fritz Kübert (footballer, born 1906) (1906–1998), German footballer, committee member, youth coach and honorary member of Eintracht Frankfurt
- Fritz Kübert (footballer, born 1939) (1939–1997), German footballer of Eintracht Frankfurt

== See also ==
- Kubert (disambiguation)
