= Modular unit =

Concept in mathematics

In mathematics, modular units are certain units of rings of integers of fields of modular functions, introduced by Kubert and Lang (1975). They are functions whose zeroes and poles are confined to the cusps (images of infinity).

== See also ==
- Cyclotomic unit
- Elliptic unit
