= Lang's theorem =

Theorem in algebraic geometry

In algebraic geometry, Lang's theorem, introduced by Serge Lang, states: if G is a connected smooth algebraic group over a finite field $\mathbf{F}_q$, then, writing $\sigma: G \to G, \, x \mapsto x^q$ for the Frobenius, the morphism of varieties

$G \to G, \, x \mapsto x^{-1} \sigma(x)$

is surjective. Note that the kernel of this map (i.e., $G = G(\overline{\mathbf{F}_q}) \to G(\overline{\mathbf{F}_q})$) is precisely $G(\mathbf{F}_q)$.

The theorem implies that $H^1(\mathbf{F}_q, G) = H_{\mathrm{\acute{e}t}}^1(\operatorname{Spec}\mathbf{F}_q, G)$ vanishes, and, consequently, any G-bundle on $\operatorname{Spec} \mathbf{F}_q$ is isomorphic to the trivial one. Also, the theorem plays a basic role in the theory of finite groups of Lie type.

It is not necessary that G is affine. Thus, the theorem also applies to abelian varieties (e.g., elliptic curves.) In fact, this application was Lang's initial motivation. If G is affine, the Frobenius $\sigma$ may be replaced by any surjective map with finitely many fixed points (see below for the precise statement.)

The proof (given below) actually goes through for any $\sigma$ that induces a nilpotent operator on the Lie algebra of G.

== The Lang–Steinberg theorem ==
Steinberg (1968) gave a useful improvement to the theorem.

Suppose that F is an endomorphism of an algebraic group G. The Lang map is the map from G to G taking g to g^{−1}F(g).

The Lang–Steinberg theorem states that if F is surjective and has a finite number of fixed points, and G is a connected affine algebraic group over an algebraically closed field, then the Lang map is surjective.

== Proof of Lang's theorem ==
Define:

$$f_a: G \to G, \quad f_a(x) = x^{-1}a\sigma(x).$$

Then, by identifying the tangent space at a with the tangent space at the identity element, we have:

$(d f_a)_e = d(h \circ (x \mapsto (x^{-1}, a, \sigma(x))))_e = dh_{(e, a, e)} \circ (-1, 0, d\sigma_e) = -1 + d \sigma_e$

where $h(x, y, z) = xyz$. It follows $(d f_a)_e$ is bijective since the differential of the Frobenius $\sigma$ vanishes. Since $f_a(bx) = f_{f_a(b)}(x)$, we also see that $(df_a)_b$ is bijective for any b. Let X be the closure of the image of $f_1$. The smooth points of X form an open dense subset; thus, there is some b in G such that $f_1(b)$ is a smooth point of X. Since the tangent space to X at $f_1(b)$ and the tangent space to G at b have the same dimension, it follows that X and G have the same dimension, since G is smooth. Since G is connected, the image of $f_1$ then contains an open dense subset U of G. Now, given an arbitrary element a in G, by the same reasoning, the image of $f_a$ contains an open dense subset V of G. The intersection $U \cap V$ is then nonempty but then this implies a is in the image of $f_1$.
