= Marvin Greenberg =

American mathematician (1935–2017)

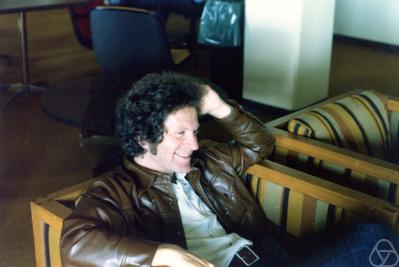
Marvin Greenberg at Berkeley in 1975

Marvin Jay Greenberg (December 22, 1935 – December 12, 2017) was an American mathematician.

== Education ==
Greenberg studied at Columbia University where he received his bachelor's degree in 1955 (he was a Ford Scholar as an undergraduate) and received his doctorate 1959 from Princeton University under Serge Lang with the thesis Pro-Algebraic Structure on the Rational Subgroup of a P-Adic Abelian Variety.

== Career ==
From 1955 Greenberg was an assistant at Princeton, from 1958 an assistant at the University of Chicago and in 1958 and 1959, an instructor at Rutgers University. From 1959 to 1964 he was an assistant professor at the University of California, Berkeley, two years of which time he spent on National Science Foundation postdoctoral fellowships at Harvard University and the Institut des Hautes Études Scientifiques in Paris.

From 1965 to 1967 he was an associate professor at Northeastern University and from 1967 he worked as an associate professor, and later full professor, at the University of California, Santa Cruz. He retired early in 1992 and moved back to Berkeley.

He was known for his book on non-Euclidean geometry (1st edition, 1974; 4th edition, 2008) and his book on algebraic topology (1st edition, 1967, published with the title Lectures on Algebraic Topology; revised edition published, with John R. Harper as co-author, in 1981 with the title Algebraic Topology: A First Course).

Greenberg was also a passionate golfer and a founding member of the Shivas Irons Society.
