= Cyclotomic unit =

Algebraic number field unit

In mathematics, a cyclotomic unit (or circular unit) is a unit of an algebraic number field which is the product of numbers of the form (ζ^{a}_{n} − 1) for ζ_{n} an n^{th} root of unity and 0 < a < n.

== Properties ==
The cyclotomic units form a subgroup of finite index in the group of units of a cyclotomic field. The index of this subgroup of real cyclotomic units (those cyclotomic units in the maximal real subfield) within the full real unit group is equal to the class number of the maximal real subfield of the cyclotomic field.

- If n is a prime power then ζ^{a}_{n} − 1 is not a unit; however the numbers (ζ^{a}_{n} − 1)/(ζ_{n} − 1) for (a, n) = 1, and ±ζ^{a}_{n} generate the group of cyclotomic units.
- If n is composite having two or more distinct prime factors, then ζ^{a}_{n} − 1 is a unit. The subgroup of cyclotomic units generated by (ζ^{a}_{n} − 1)/(ζ_{n} − 1) with (a, n) = 1 is not of finite index in general.

The cyclotomic units satisfy distribution relations. Let a be a rational number prime to p and let g_{a} denote exp(2πia) − 1. Then for a ≠ 0 we have $\prod_{p b=a} g_b = g_a$.

Using these distribution relations and the symmetry relation ζ^{a}_{n} − 1 = −ζ^{a}_{n} (ζ^{−a}_{n} − 1), a basis B_{n} of the cyclotomic units can be constructed with the property that B_{d} ⊆ B_{n} for d | n.

== See also ==
- Elliptic unit
- Modular unit
