= Kubert =

Kubert may refer to:

- The Kubert School, Art schools in Dover, New Jersey

== People with the name Kubert ==
- Adam Kubert (born 1959), American comic book artist
- Andy Kubert (born 1962), American comic book artist
- Daniel Kubert (1947–2010), American mathematician
- Joe Kubert (1926–2012), American comic book artist
- Kubert Leung, musician and Cantopop songwriter in Hong Kong
