= Tu Tsung-ming =

Taiwanese pharmacologist (1893–1986)

- 杜聰明
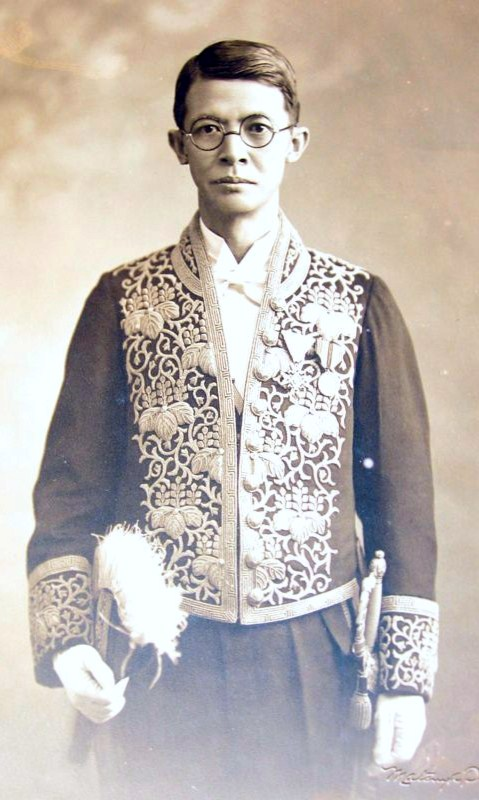
- Born: August 25, 1893; Chi-lân-sam-pó, Tamsui County, Taipeh Prefecture, Taiwan, Qing Empire (now Tamsui, New Taipei, Taiwan)
- Died: February 25, 1986 (aged 92); Taipei, Taiwan
- Education: Taihoku Imperial University; Kyoto Imperial University (DMS)
- Occupations: Pharmacologist, educator
- Spouse: Tu Lin Shuangsui 杜林雙隨
- Relatives: Loring W. Tu (grandson)

Tu Tsung-ming (Chinese: 杜聰明; pinyin: Dù Cōngmíng, Japanese: Tō Sōmē) was a Taiwanese pharmacologist and educator who was the first Taiwanese person to earn a Doctor of Medical Sciences (equivalent to Ph.D.).

== Early life and education ==
Tu Tsung-ming was born in Tamsui in 1893. He entered Taiwan Governor-General's Medical School (臺灣總督府醫學校) in 1909. Because he scored highly on the medical school entrance exam, the school's president, Junzo Nagano (長野純蔵), admitted him as a special case despite his poor physical examination score, which was due to his small stature.

The movement to overthrow China's Qing dynasty was emerging in 1910, and he joined the underground society Tongmenghui with his friends. In 1913, Tu participated in a failed assassination attempt on Yuan Shikai.

In 1914, he graduated from the Taiwan Governor-General's Medical School at the head of his class.

After graduation, he entered Kyoto Imperial University under the support of Tugio Horiuchi (堀内次雄), the president of the Governor-General's Medical school in 1922. He pursued training and research in internal medicine and pharmacology there. He became a member of Kuomintang in 1916.

== Medical career ==
In 1921, he returned to Taiwan and started working as a lecturer in the Taiwan Governor-General's Medical College (臺灣總督府醫學專門學校). He submitted his doctoral dissertation to Kyoto Imperial University in 1922, and became a Doctor of Medical Sciences (equivalent to a Ph.D.). He was promoted to professor at the Medical College in the same year. After the establishment of the Taihoku Imperial University (臺北帝國大學)(now National Taiwan University) in 1936, he became the first Taiwanese professor in Japan's pre-1945 imperial university system. His pharmacology research lab was the cradle of medical research in Taiwan. The laboratory did pioneering research on methods to treat opium addiction, on the toxicology of snake venom, and on the pharmacology of traditional Chinese medicine.

In addition to participating in pharmacological and toxicological research, Tu also contributed to medical education. After World War II, he was the first dean of the National Taiwan University Medical College. In 1954, Tu founded Kaohsiung Medical College (now Kaohsiung Medical University) and became the first president of the College (1954–1966).

== Relatives ==
- Wife: Tu Lin Shuangsiu(杜林雙隨)
- Third son: Anthony TU(杜祖健) is a chemist. He is a specialist of toxicology, biological agent and chemical weapon. When the Matsumoto sarin attack had occurred in 1994, he advised for resolution.

== See also ==
- Tsungming Tu Award
