= Daniel Kubert =

American mathematician (1947–2010)

Daniel Sion Kubert (/ˈkjuːbərt/; October 18, 1947 – January 5, 2010) was an American mathematician who introduced modular units and Kubert identities.

He grew up in a secular Jewish family in Elkins Park, Pennsylvania, the son of David Kubert, an attorney, and Adele (Sion) Kubert, a high school teacher. Daniel graduated from Philadelphia's Central High School in 1965. Kubert graduated from Brown University in 1969, receiving B.S. and M.A. degrees in the same year. He received his Ph.D. in mathematics from Harvard University in 1973, where his dissertation "Universal Bounds on the Torsion and Isogenies of Elliptic Curves" was supervised by Barry Mazur.

Kubert served as a Gibbs Instructor at Yale University from 1973 to 1975. His work on modular units was done in collaboration with Yale mathematician Serge Lang. Kubert was hired as an assistant professor at Cornell University in 1975, and was still there at the end of the decade. By the early 1980s, Kubert was at the University of Pennsylvania. He also had two stints at the Institute for Advanced Study, in 1979–80 and 1984–85.

In later life, Kubert was a resident of Philadelphia.

== Selected publications ==
- Kubert, Daniel S.; Lang, Serge (1981), Modular units, Grundlehren der Mathematischen Wissenschaften [Fundamental Principles of Mathematical Science], vol. 244, Berlin, New York: Springer-Verlag, ISBN 978-0-387-90517-4, MR 0648603, Zbl 0492.12002
- Kubert, Dan; Lang, Serge (1975), "Units in the modular function field. I", Mathematische Annalen, 218 (1): 67–96, doi:10.1007/BF01350068, ISSN 0025-5831, MR 0437496, S2CID 177788984, Zbl 0311.14005
