= Algebra (book) =

Graduate level textbook on algebra

- First edition
- Author: Serge Lang
- Language: English
- Series: Addison-Wesley Series in Mathematics
- Subject: Algebra
- Publisher: Addison-Wesley
- Publication date: 1965
- Pages: 508

Algebra is a graduate-level textbook on abstract algebra written by Serge Lang and was originally published by Addison-Wesley in 1965. Its intended audience is students in graduate-level courses and readers who have previously attended undergraduate-level algebra courses.

== Topics ==
The third edition is divided into four parts.

- The first part, The Basic Objects of Algebra, covers groups, rings, modules, and polynomials.
- The second part, Algebraic Equations, focuses on field theory and includes a chapter on Noetherian rings and modules.
- The third part, Linear Algebra and Representations, contains chapters on the tensor product of modules and semi-simplicity.
- The fourth part, Homological Algebra, covers general homology theory and finite free resolutions.

== Audience and reception ==
The Mathematical Association of America (MAA) strongly recommends that undergraduate mathematics libraries have a copy of Lang's Algebra available.

Reviews of Algebra appeared in The Mathematical Gazette in 1967 and 2003.

Professor George Bergman of University of California, Berkeley wrote Companion to Lang's Algebra, a 222-page book of notes collected when teaching Berkeley's basic graduate algebra course from Lang’s book.
