= Serge Lang =

French-American mathematician

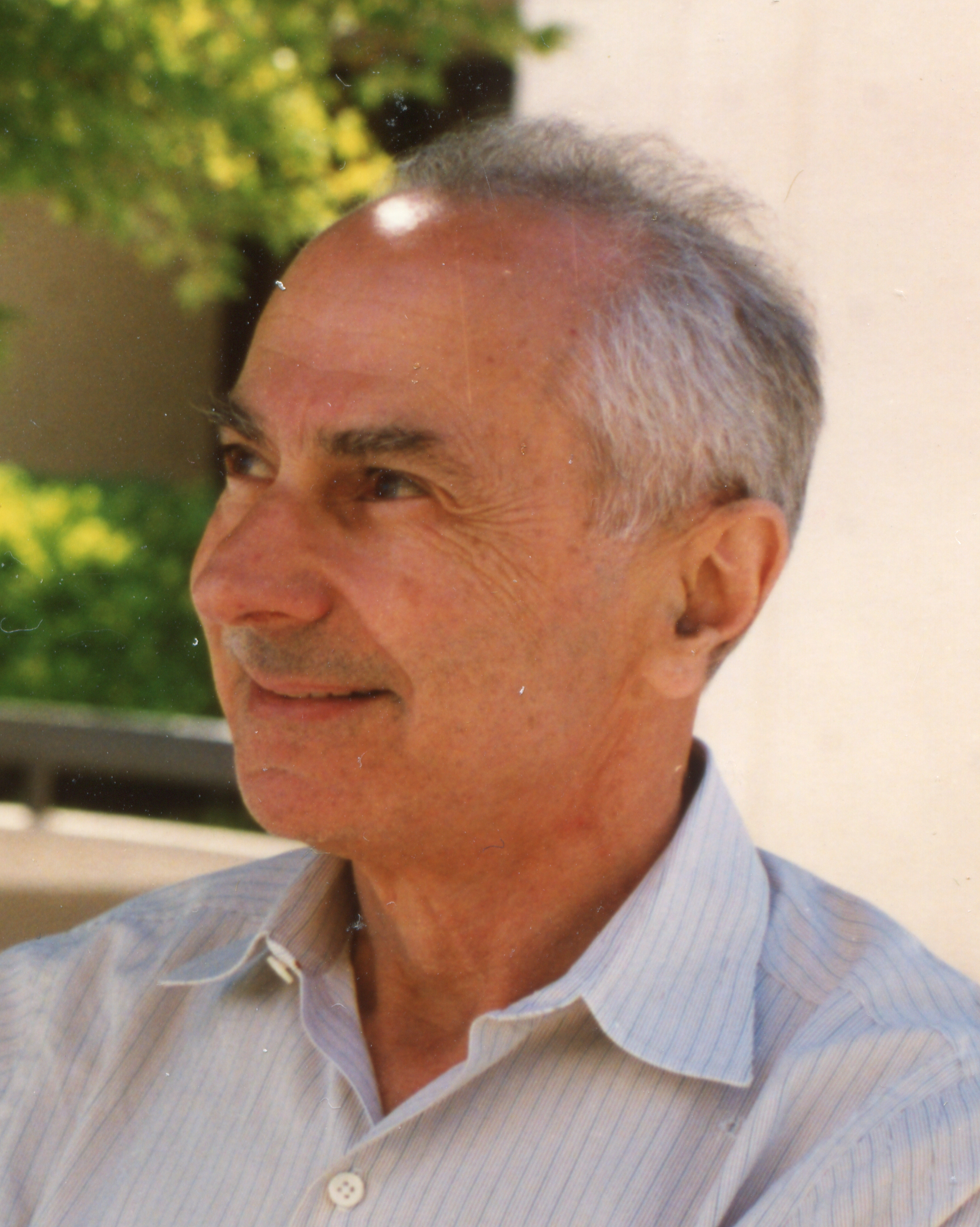
- Lang in Berkeley, 1990
- Born: May 19, 1927; Paris, France
- Died: September 12, 2005 (aged 78); Berkeley, California, U.S.
- Education: California Institute of Technology (BA); Princeton University (PhD)
- Known for: Work in number theory
- Awards: Leroy P. Steele Prize (1999); Cole Prize (1960)
- Scientific career
- Fields: Mathematics
- Workplaces: University of Chicago; Columbia University; Yale University
- Thesis: On Quasi Algebraic Closure (1951)
- Doctoral advisor: Emil Artin
- Doctoral students: Marvin Greenberg; Minhyong Kim; Stephen Schanuel

Serge Lang (French: [lɑ̃ɡ]; May 19, 1927 – September 12, 2005) was a French-American mathematician and activist who taught at Yale University for most of his career. He is known for his work in number theory and for his mathematics textbooks, including the influential Algebra. He received the Frank Nelson Cole Prize in 1960 and was a member of the Bourbaki group.

As an activist, Lang campaigned against the Vietnam War, and also successfully fought against the nomination of the political scientist Samuel P. Huntington to the National Academies of Science. Later in his life, Lang was an HIV/AIDS denialist. He claimed that HIV had not been proven to cause AIDS and protested Yale's research into HIV/AIDS.

== Early life ==
Lang was born in Saint-Germain-en-Laye, close to Paris, in 1927. He had a twin brother who became a basketball coach and a sister who became an actress. Lang moved with his family to California as a teenager, where he graduated in 1943 from Beverly Hills High School. After completing his undergraduate education at the California Institute of Technology in 1946, he received a PhD in mathematics from Princeton University in 1951. He held faculty positions at the University of Chicago, Columbia University (from 1955, leaving in 1971 in a dispute), and Yale University.

Lang studied at Princeton University, writing his thesis titled "On quasi algebraic closure" under the supervision of Emil Artin, and then worked on the geometric analogues of class field theory and diophantine geometry. Later he moved into diophantine approximation and transcendental number theory, proving the Schneider–Lang theorem. A break in research while he was involved in trying to meet 1960s student activism halfway caused him (by his own description) difficulties in picking up the threads afterwards. He wrote on modular forms and modular units, the idea of a "distribution" on a profinite group, and value distribution theory. He made a number of conjectures in diophantine geometry: Mordell–Lang conjecture, Bombieri–Lang conjecture, Lang–Trotter conjecture, and the Lang conjecture on analytically hyperbolic varieties. He introduced the Lang map, the Katz–Lang finiteness theorem, and the Lang–Steinberg theorem (cf. Lang's theorem) in algebraic groups.

== Mathematical books ==
Lang was a prolific writer of mathematical texts, often completing one on his summer vacation. Most are at the graduate level. He wrote calculus texts and also prepared a book on group cohomology for Bourbaki. Lang's Algebra, a graduate-level introduction to algebra, was a highly influential text that ran through numerous updated editions. His Steele prize citation stated, "Lang's Algebra changed the way graduate algebra is taught...It has affected all subsequent graduate-level algebra books." It contained ideas of his teacher, Artin; some of the most interesting passages in Algebraic Number Theory also reflect Artin's influence and ideas that might otherwise not have been published in that or any form.

== Awards as expositor ==
Lang was noted for his eagerness for contact with students. He was described as a passionate teacher who would throw chalk at students who he believed were not paying attention. One of his colleagues recalled: "He would rant and rave in front of his students. He would say, 'Our two aims are truth and clarity, and to achieve these I will shout in class.'" He won a Leroy P. Steele Prize for Mathematical Exposition (1999) from the American Mathematical Society. In 1960, he won the sixth Frank Nelson Cole Prize in Algebra for his paper "Unramified class field theory over function fields in several variables" (Annals of Mathematics, Series 2, volume 64 (1956), pp. 285–325).

== Activism ==
Lang spent much of his professional time engaged in political activism. He was a staunch socialist and active in opposition to the Vietnam War, volunteering for the 1966 anti-war campaign of Robert Scheer (the subject of his book The Scheer Campaign). Lang later quit his position at Columbia in 1971 in protest over the university's treatment of anti-war protesters.

Lang engaged in several efforts to challenge anyone he believed was spreading misinformation or misusing science or mathematics to further their own goals. He attacked the 1977 Survey of the American Professoriate, an opinion questionnaire that Seymour Martin Lipset and E. C. Ladd had sent to thousands of college professors in the United States. Lang said it contained numerous biased and loaded questions. This led to a public and highly acrimonious conflict as detailed in his book The File : Case Study in Correction (1977-1979).

In 1986, Lang mounted what the New York Times described as a "one-man challenge" against the nomination of political scientist Samuel P. Huntington to the National Academy of Sciences. Lang described Huntington's research, in particular his use of mathematical equations to demonstrate that South Africa was a "satisfied society", as "pseudoscience", arguing that it gave "the illusion of science without any of its substance." Despite support for Huntington from the Academy's social and behavioral scientists, Lang's challenge was successful, and Huntington was twice rejected for Academy membership. Huntington's supporters argued that Lang's opposition was political rather than scientific in nature. Lang's detailed description of these events, "Academia, Journalism, and Politics: A Case Study: The Huntington Case", occupies the first 222 pages of his 1998 book Challenges.

Lang kept his political correspondence and related documentation in extensive "files". He would send letters or publish articles, wait for responses, engage the writers in further correspondence, collect all these writings together and point out what he considered contradictions. He often mailed these files to mathematicians and other interested parties throughout the world. Some of the files were published in his books Challenges and The File : Case Study in Correction (1977-1979). His extensive file criticizing Nobel laureate David Baltimore was published in the journal Ethics and Behaviour in January 1993 and in his book Challenges. Lang fought the decision by Yale University to hire Daniel Kevles, a historian of science, because Lang disagreed with Kevles' analysis in The Baltimore Case.

In the last twelve years of his life, Lang challenged the scientific consensus on the connection between HIV and AIDS. He argued that existing data did not support the conclusion that HIV causes AIDS. A portion of Challenges is devoted to this issue.

== List of books ==
Pregraduate-level textbooks

- Lang, Serge (1986). A first course in calculus. Undergraduate Texts in Mathematics (Fifth edition of 1964 original ed.). New York: Springer-Verlag. doi:10.1007/978-1-4419-8532-3. ISBN 978-1-4612-6428-6. The 1964 first edition was reprinted as:
  - Short calculus: the original edition of "A First Course in Calculus". Undergraduate Texts in Mathematics. New York: Springer-Verlag. 2002. doi:10.1007/978-1-4613-0077-9. ISBN 978-0-387-95327-4.
- Lang, Serge (1986). Introduction to linear algebra. Undergraduate Texts in Mathematics (Second edition of 1970 original ed.). New York: Springer-Verlag. doi:10.1007/978-1-4612-1070-2. ISBN 978-0-387-96205-4. S2CID 117514050.
- Lang, Serge (1987). Calculus of several variables. Undergraduate Texts in Mathematics (Third edition of 1973 original ed.). New York: Springer-Verlag. doi:10.1007/978-1-4612-1068-9. ISBN 978-0-387-96405-8. Originally published as A Second Course in Calculus (1965)
- Lang, Serge (1987). Linear algebra. Undergraduate Texts in Mathematics (Third edition of 1966 original ed.). New York: Springer-Verlag. doi:10.1007/978-1-4757-1949-9. ISBN 0-387-96412-6. MR 0874113.

- Shakarchi, Rami (1996). Solutions manual for Lang's "Linear Algebra". New York: Springer-Verlag. doi:10.1007/978-1-4612-0755-9. ISBN 0-387-94760-4. MR 1415837.

- Lang, Serge (1988). Basic mathematics (Reprint of 1971 original ed.). New York: Springer-Verlag.
- Lang, Serge; Murrow, Gene (1988). Geometry: a high school course. New York: Springer-Verlag. doi:10.1007/978-1-4757-2022-8. ISBN 978-0-387-96654-0.
- Lang, Serge (1997). Undergraduate analysis. Undergraduate Texts in Mathematics (Second ed.). New York: Springer-Verlag. doi:10.1007/978-1-4757-2698-5. ISBN 0-387-94841-4. MR 1476913. The first edition (1983) of this title was itself the second edition of Analysis I (1968)

- Shakarchi, Rami (1998). Problems and solutions for "Undergraduate Analysis". New York: Springer-Verlag. doi:10.1007/978-1-4612-1738-1. ISBN 0-387-98235-3. MR 1488961.

- Lang, Serge (1999). Complex analysis. Graduate Texts in Mathematics. Vol. 103 (Fourth edition of 1977 original ed.). New York: Springer-Verlag. doi:10.1007/978-1-4757-3083-8. ISBN 0-387-98592-1. MR 1659317.

- Shakarchi, Rami (1999). Problems and solutions for "Complex Analysis". New York: Springer-Verlag. doi:10.1007/978-1-4612-1534-9. ISBN 978-0-387-98831-3. MR 1716449.

- Lang, Serge (2005). Undergraduate algebra. Undergraduate Texts in Mathematics (Third edition of 1990 original ed.). New York: Springer-Verlag. doi:10.1007/0-387-27475-8. ISBN 0-387-22025-9. The 1990 first edition was itself a second edition of Algebraic Structures (1967)

Graduate-level textbooks

- Lang, Serge (1962). Diophantine Geometry. Interscience Tracts in Pure and Applied Mathematics. Vol. 11. New York: Interscience Publishers. MR 0142550. Zbl 0115.38701.
- Lang, Serge (1966). Introduction to transcendental numbers. Reading, MA–London–Don Mills, Ontario: Addison-Wesley Publishing Co. MR 0214547.
- Lang, Serge (1972). Introduction to algebraic geometry (Third printing, with corrections, of 1959 original ed.). Reading, MA: Addison-Wesley Publishing Co. MR 0344244.
- Lang, Serge; Trotter, Hale (1976). Frobenius Distributions in GL2-Extensions. Lecture Notes in Mathematics. Vol. 504. Berlin–New York: Springer-Verlag. doi:10.1007/BFb0082087. ISBN 978-3-540-07550-9. MR 0568299.
- Lang, Serge (1978). Elliptic curves: Diophantine analysis. Grundlehren der Mathematischen Wissenschaften. Vol. 231. Berlin–New York: Springer-Verlag. doi:10.1007/978-3-662-07010-9. ISBN 3-540-08489-4. MR 0518817.
- Kubert, Daniel S.; Lang, Serge (1981). Modular units. Grundlehren der Mathematischen Wissenschaften. Vol. 244. New York–Berlin: Springer-Verlag. doi:10.1007/978-1-4757-1741-9. ISBN 0-387-90517-0. MR 0648603.
- Lang, Serge (1982). Introduction to algebraic and abelian functions. Graduate Texts in Mathematics. Vol. 89 (Second edition of 1972 original ed.). New York–Berlin: Springer-Verlag. doi:10.1007/978-1-4612-5740-0. ISBN 0-387-90710-6. MR 0681120.
- Lang, Serge (1983). Abelian varieties (Reprint of 1959 original ed.). New York–Berlin: Springer-Verlag. doi:10.1007/978-1-4419-8534-7. ISBN 0-387-90875-7. MR 0713430.
- Lang, Serge (1983). Complex multiplication. Grundlehren der mathematischen Wissenschaften. Vol. 255. New York: Springer-Verlag. doi:10.1007/978-1-4612-5485-0. ISBN 0-387-90786-6. MR 0713612.
- Lang, Serge (1983). Fundamentals of Diophantine geometry. New York: Springer-Verlag. doi:10.1007/978-1-4757-1810-2. ISBN 0-387-90837-4. MR 0715605. Second edition of Lang (1962)
- Fulton, William; Lang, Serge (1985). Riemann–Roch algebra. Grundlehren der mathematischen Wissenschaften. Vol. 277. New York: Springer-Verlag. doi:10.1007/978-1-4757-1858-4. ISBN 978-1-4419-3073-6. MR 0801033.
- Lang, Serge (1985). SL_{2}(R). Graduate Texts in Mathematics. Vol. 105 (Reprint of the 1975 original ed.). New York: Springer-Verlag. doi:10.1007/978-1-4612-5142-2. ISBN 0-387-96198-4. MR 0803508.
- Lang, Serge (1987). Elliptic functions. Graduate Texts in Mathematics. Vol. 112. With an appendix by J. Tate (Second edition of 1973 original ed.). New York: Springer-Verlag. doi:10.1007/978-1-4612-4752-4. ISBN 0-387-96508-4. MR 0890960.
- Lang, Serge (1987). Introduction to complex hyperbolic spaces. New York: Springer-Verlag. doi:10.1007/978-1-4757-1945-1. ISBN 0-387-96447-9. MR 0886677.
- Lang, Serge (1988). Introduction to Arakelov theory. New York: Springer-Verlag. doi:10.1007/978-1-4612-1031-3. ISBN 0-387-96793-1. MR 0969124.
- Lang, Serge (1990). Cyclotomic fields I and II. Graduate Texts in Mathematics. Vol. 121. With an appendix by Karl Rubin (Combined second edition of 1978/1980 original ed.). New York: Springer-Verlag. doi:10.1007/978-1-4612-0987-4. ISBN 0-387-96671-4. MR 1029028.
- Lang, Serge; Cherry, William (1990). Topics in Nevanlinna Theory. Lecture Notes in Mathematics. Vol. 1433. With an appendix by Zhuan Ye. Berlin: Springer-Verlag. doi:10.1007/BFb0093846. ISBN 3-540-52785-0. MR 1069755.
- Lang, Serge (1993). Real and functional analysis. Graduate Texts in Mathematics. Vol. 142 (Third ed.). New York: Springer-Verlag. doi:10.1007/978-1-4612-0897-6. ISBN 0-387-94001-4. MR 1216137. This book is the third edition, previously published under the different titles of Analysis II (1968) and Real Analysis (1983)
- Jorgenson, Jay; Lang, Serge (1993). Basic Analysis of Regularized Series and Products. Lecture Notes in Mathematics. Vol. 1564. Berlin: Springer-Verlag. doi:10.1007/BFb0077194. ISBN 3-540-57488-3. MR 1284924.
- Lang, Serge (1994). Algebraic number theory. Graduate Texts in Mathematics. Vol. 110 (Second edition of 1970 original ed.). New York: Springer-Verlag. doi:10.1007/978-1-4612-0853-2. ISBN 0-387-94225-4. MR 1282723. The first edition was itself the second edition of Algebraic Numbers (1964)
- Lang, Serge (1995). Introduction to Diophantine approximations (Second edition of 1966 original ed.). New York: Springer-Verlag. doi:10.1007/978-1-4612-4220-8. ISBN 0-387-94456-7. MR 1348400.
- Lang, Serge (1995). Introduction to modular forms. Grundlehren der mathematischen Wissenschaften. Vol. 222. With appendixes by D. Zagier and Walter Feit (Corrected reprint of the 1976 original ed.). Berlin: Springer-Verlag. doi:10.1007/978-3-642-51447-0. ISBN 3-540-07833-9. MR 1363488.
- Lang, Serge (1996). Topics in Cohomology of Groups. Lecture Notes in Mathematics. Vol. 1625. Chapter X based on letters written by John Tate (Translated from the 1967 French original ed.). Berlin: Springer-Verlag. doi:10.1007/BFb0092624. ISBN 3-540-61181-9. MR 1439508.
- Lang, S. (1997), Survey of Diophantine geometry, Berlin: Springer-Verlag, ISBN 3-540-61223-8, Zbl 0869.11051
- Lang, Serge (1999). Fundamentals of differential geometry. Graduate Texts in Mathematics. Vol. 191. New York: Springer-Verlag. doi:10.1007/978-1-4612-0541-8. ISBN 0-387-98593-X. MR 1666820. This book is the fourth edition, previously published under the different titles of Introduction to Differentiable Manifolds (1962), Differential Manifolds (1972), and Differential and Riemannian Manifolds (1995). Lang also published a distinct second edition (preserving the title of the 1962 original) so as to provide a companion volume to Fundamentals of Differential Geometry which covers a portion of the same material, but with the more elementary exposition confined to finite-dimensional manifolds:

- Lang, Serge (2002). Introduction to differentiable manifolds. Universitext (Second ed.). New York: Springer-Verlag. doi:10.1007/b97450. ISBN 0-387-95477-5. MR 1931083.

- Jorgenson, Jay; Lang, Serge (2001). Spherical inversion on SL_{n}(R). Springer Monographs in Mathematics. New York: Springer-Verlag. doi:10.1007/978-1-4684-9302-3. ISBN 0-387-95115-6. MR 1834111.
- Lang, Serge (2002). Algebra. Graduate Texts in Mathematics. Vol. 211 (Revised third edition of 1965 original ed.). New York: Springer-Verlag. doi:10.1007/978-1-4613-0041-0. ISBN 0-387-95385-X. MR 1878556.
- Jorgenson, Jay; Lang, Serge (2005). Posn(R) and Eisenstein Series. Lecture Notes in Mathematics. Vol. 1868. Berlin: Springer-Verlag. doi:10.1007/b136063. ISBN 978-3-540-25787-5. MR 2166237.
- Jorgenson, Jay; Lang, Serge (2008). The heat kernel and theta inversion on SL_{2}(C). Springer Monographs in Mathematics. New York: Springer. doi:10.1007/978-0-387-38032-2. ISBN 978-0-387-38031-5. MR 2449649.
- Jorgenson, Jay; Lang, Serge (2009). Heat Eisenstein series on SL_{n}(C). Memoirs of the American Mathematical Society. Vol. 201. doi:10.1090/memo/0946. ISBN 978-0-8218-4044-3. MR 2548067.

Other

- Lang, Serge (1981). The file. Case study in correction (1977–1979). New York: Springer-Verlag.
- Lang, Serge (1985). The beauty of doing mathematics. Three public dialogues. Translated from the French. New York: Springer-Verlag. doi:10.1007/978-1-4612-1102-0. ISBN 0-387-96149-6. MR 0804668.
- Lang, Serge (1985). Math!: Encounters with high school students. New York: Springer-Verlag. doi:10.1007/978-1-4757-1860-7. ISBN 978-0-387-96129-3.
- Lang, Serge (1998). Challenges. New York: Springer. doi:10.1007/978-1-4612-1638-4. ISBN 978-0-387-94861-4.
- Lang, Serge (1999). Math talks for undergraduates. New York: Springer-Verlag. doi:10.1007/978-1-4612-1476-2. ISBN 0-387-98749-5. MR 1697559.
- Lang, Serge (2000). Collected papers. I. 1952–1970. Springer Collected Works in Mathematics. New York: Springer. ISBN 0-387-98802-5. MR 1772967.
- Lang, Serge (2000). Collected papers. II. 1971–1977. Springer Collected Works in Mathematics. New York: Springer. ISBN 0-387-98803-3. MR 1770235.
- Lang, Serge (2000). Collected papers. III. 1978–1990. Springer Collected Works in Mathematics. New York: Springer. ISBN 0-387-98800-9. MR 1781669.
- Lang, Serge (2000). Collected papers. IV. 1990–1996. Springer Collected Works in Mathematics. New York: Springer. ISBN 0-387-98804-1. MR 1781668.
- Lang, Serge (2001). Collected papers. V. 1993–1999. Springer Collected Works in Mathematics. New York: Springer. ISBN 0-387-95030-3. MR 1781684.

== Sources and further reading ==
- Steele Prize citation and Lang's acceptance (AMS Notices, April 1999)
- Jorgenson, Jay; Krantz, Steven G., eds. (May 2006). "Serge Lang, 1927–2005" (PDF). Notices of the American Mathematical Society. 53 (5): 536–553.
- Jorgenson, Jay; Krantz, Steven G., eds. (April 2007). "The Mathematical Contributions of Serge Lang" (PDF). Notices of the AMS. 54 (4): 476–497. Archived from the original (PDF) on 2012-10-09.
