= An Introduction to Manifolds =

2009 mathematics textbook by Loring W. Tu

An Introduction to Manifolds is a mathematics textbook written by Loring W. Tu providing an introduction to differential and integral calculus on smooth manifolds. It was first published in 2008 by Springer and received positive reviews. The book is meant as a precursor to Differential Forms in Algebraic Topology by Raoul Bott and Tu.
