= Loring W. Tu =

Taiwanese-American mathematician

- 杜武亮
- Born: Taipei, Taiwan
- Education: Princeton University (BA); Harvard University (MA, PhD)
- Scientific career
- Fields: Algebraic topology
- Institutions: University of Michigan; Johns Hopkins University; Tufts University
- Thesis: Variation of Hodge Structure and the Local Torelli Problem (1979)
- Doctoral advisor: Phillip A. Griffiths
- Other academic advisors: Raoul Bott

Loring W. Tu (traditional Chinese: 杜武亮; Wade–Giles: Tu Wu-liang; born 1955) is a Taiwanese-American mathematician working in algebraic topology and geometry.

== Life ==
Tu was born in Taipei, Taiwan, the grandson of Taiwanese pharmacologist Tu Tsung-ming, founder of Taiwan's first private medical school (now Kaohsiung Medical University) and the first dean of the School of Medicine of National Taiwan University.

Tu is a younger brother of Charles Wuching Tu, who is a professor of electrical and computer engineering (ECE) at the University of California, San Diego. He also has another brother, Samson Tu; all siblings became academics. During his childhood, Tu and his family lived with his grandparents. When Tsung-ming established Kaohsiung Medical University, Tu and his family moved with him to Kaohsiung, Taiwan.

Tu and his brothers were educated at Datong Elementary School in Kaohsiung, and Tu attended Kaohsiung Municipal No. 2 Middle School, leaving Taiwan for United States and Canada while still in junior high school. Tu initially entered McGill University to study pure mathematics and later transferred to complete his undergraduate studies in the United States. He graduated from Princeton University in 1974 with a Bachelor of Arts (B.A.) in mathematics, then entered graduate school at Harvard University, where he was mentored by professors Raoul Bott and Phillip Griffiths. Tu earned a Master of Arts and Ph.D. in mathematics from Harvard in 1976 and 1979, respectively. His doctoral advisor was Phillip A. Griffiths. His doctoral thesis was titled "Variation of Hodge Structure and the Local Torelli Problem".

== Career ==
Tu has been working at Tufts University since 1986, and plans to retire after 2025. On November 12, 2024, Tufts University announced that Tu would gift the university an eight-figure donation and rename the Science and Engineering Complex as the Tsungming Tu Complex in honor of Loring's late grandfather. He has frequently collaborated with Raoul Bott.

== Bibliography ==
Some of his books and papers are:

- Introductory Lectures on Equivariant Cohomology (2020) ISBN 9780691191744
- Differential Geometry: Connections, Curvature, and Characteristic Classes (2017) ISBN 9783319550824 doi:10.1007/978-3-319-55084-8
- An Introduction to Manifolds (2007) ISBN 9781441973993 doi:10.1007/978-1-4419-7400-6
- Hodge Theory And The Local Torelli Problem (1983) ISBN 978-0-8218-2279-1
- Differential Forms In Algebraic Topology (1982, with Raoul Bott) ISBN 9780387906133 doi:10.1007/978-1-4757-3951-0
