= Dirac hole theory =

Interpretation of solutions to Dirac's equation

Dirac hole theory is a theory in quantum mechanics, named after English theoretical physicist Paul Dirac, who introduced it in 1929. The theory poses that the continuum of negative energy states, that are solutions to the Dirac equation, are filled with electrons, and the vacancies in this continuum (holes) are manifested as positrons with energy and momentum that are the negative of those of the state. The discovery of the positron in 1929 gave a considerable support to the Dirac hole theory.

While Enrico Fermi, Niels Bohr and Wolfgang Pauli were skeptical about the theory, other physicists, like Guido Beck and Kurt Sitte, made use of Dirac hole theory in alternative theories of beta decay. Gian Wick extended Dirac hole theory to cover neutrinos, introducing the anti-neutrino as a hole in a neutrino Dirac sea.

== Pair production and annihilation ==
Hole theory provides an alternative perspective on the processes of pair production and annihilation – when a photon of sufficient energy is incident upon an occupied state in the negative energy 'sea', it can excite an electron into the positive energy region, creating both an observable electron while creating a vacant state (hole) in the negative energy region – an anti-electron, or more commonly, a positron.

Conversely, due to the principle of least action, the close proximity of an electron and positron presents an opportunity for the electron to de-excite, releasing a photon, reducing the overall energy of the system – this is observationally identical to the process of annihilation.
