= Graviquake =

Earthquake caused by gravitational energy

A graviquake is an earthquake occurring in an extensional tectonic setting, where the gravitational energy stored during the interseismic period is delivered by the collapse of a brittle upper crustal volume, slipping along a normal fault and generating the double couple recorded in the moment tensor solution.
