= Causal fermion systems =

Candidate unified theory of physics

The theory of causal fermion systems is an approach to describe fundamental physics. It provides a unification of the weak, the strong and the electromagnetic forces with gravity at the level of classical field theory. Moreover, it gives quantum mechanics and quantum field theory as limiting cases. Therefore, it is a candidate for a unified physical theory. Instead of introducing physical objects on a preexisting spacetime manifold, the general concept is to derive spacetime as well as all the objects therein as secondary objects from the structures of an underlying causal fermion system. This concept also makes it possible to generalize notions of differential geometry to the non-smooth setting. In particular, one can describe situations when spacetime no longer has a manifold structure on the microscopic scale (like a spacetime lattice or other discrete or continuous structures on the Planck scale). As a result, the theory of causal fermion systems is a proposal for quantum geometry and an approach to quantum gravity.

Causal fermion systems were introduced by Felix Finster and collaborators.

== Motivation and physical concept ==
The physical starting point is the fact that the Dirac equation in Minkowski space has solutions of negative energy which are usually associated with the Dirac sea. Taking the concept seriously that the states of the Dirac sea form an integral part of the physical system, one finds that many structures (like the causal and metric structures as well as the bosonic fields) can be recovered from the wave functions of the sea states. This leads to the idea that the wave functions of all occupied states (including the sea states) should be regarded as the basic physical objects, and that all structures in spacetime arise as a result of the collective interaction of the sea states with each other and with the additional particles and "holes" in the sea. Implementing this picture mathematically leads to the framework of causal fermion systems.

More precisely, the correspondence between the above physical situation and the mathematical framework is obtained as follows. All occupied states span a Hilbert space of wave functions in Minkowski space $\hat{M}$. The observable information on the distribution of the wave functions in spacetime is encoded in the local correlation operators $F(x), x \in \hat{M},$ which in an orthonormal basis $(\psi_i)$ have the matrix representation

$$\big( F(x) \big)^i_j = - \overline{\psi_i(x)} \psi_j(x)$$

(where $\overline{\psi}$ is the adjoint spinor). In order to make the wave functions into the basic physical objects, one considers the set $\{ F(x) \,|\, x \in \hat{M} \}$ as a set of linear operators on an abstract Hilbert space. The structures of Minkowski space are all disregarded, except for the volume measure $d^4x$, which is transformed to a corresponding measure on the linear operators (the "universal measure"). The resulting structures, namely a Hilbert space together with a measure on the linear operators thereon, are the basic ingredients of a causal fermion system.

The above construction can also be carried out in more general spacetimes. Moreover, taking the abstract definition as the starting point, causal fermion systems allow for the description of generalized "quantum spacetimes." The physical picture is that one causal fermion system describes a spacetime together with all structures and objects therein (like the causal and the metric structures, wave functions and quantum fields). In order to single out the physically admissible causal fermion systems, one must formulate physical equations. By analogy to the Lagrangian formulation of classical field theory, the physical equations for causal fermion systems are formulated via a variational principle, the so-called causal action principle. Since one works with different basic objects, the causal action principle has a novel mathematical structure where one minimizes a positive action under variations of the universal measure. The connection to conventional physical equations is obtained in a certain limiting case (the continuum limit) in which the interaction can be described effectively by gauge fields coupled to particles and antiparticles, whereas the Dirac sea is no longer apparent.

== General mathematical setting ==
In this section the mathematical framework of causal fermion systems is introduced.

=== Definition ===
A causal fermion system of spin dimension $n \in \mathbb{N}$ is a triple $(\mathcal H, \mathcal F, \rho)$ where

- $(\mathcal H, \langle .|. \rangle_{\mathcal{H}})$ is a complex Hilbert space.
- $\mathcal F$ is the set of all self-adjoint linear operators of finite rank on $\mathcal H$ which (counting multiplicities) have at most $n$ positive and at most $n$ negative eigenvalues.
- $\rho$ is a measure on $\mathcal F$.

The measure $\rho$ is referred to as the universal measure.

As will be outlined below, this definition is rich enough to encode analogs of the mathematical structures needed to formulate physical theories. In particular, a causal fermion system gives rise to a spacetime together with additional structures that generalize objects like spinors, the metric and curvature. Moreover, it comprises quantum objects like wave functions and a fermionic Fock state.

=== The causal action principle ===
Inspired by the Lagrangian formulation of classical field theory, the dynamics on a causal fermion system is described by a variational principle defined as follows.

Given a Hilbert space $(\mathcal H, \langle .|. \rangle_{\mathcal{H}})$ and the spin dimension $n$, the set $\mathcal F$ is defined as above. Then for any $x,y \in {\mathcal{F}}$, the product $x y$ is an operator of rank at most $2n$. It is not necessarily self-adjoint because in general $(xy)^* = y x \neq xy$. We denote the non-trivial eigenvalues of the operator $x y$ (counting algebraic multiplicities) by

$$\lambda^{xy}_1, \ldots, \lambda^{xy}_{2n} \in {\mathbb{C}} .$$

Moreover, the spectral weight $| . |$ is defined by

$$|xy| = \sum_{i=1}^{2n} |\lambda^{xy}_i| \quad \text{and} \quad
\big| (xy)^2 \big| = \sum_{i=1}^{2n} |\lambda^{xy}_i|^2 {\,}.$$

The Lagrangian is introduced by

$${\mathcal{L}}(x,y) = \big| (xy)^2 \big| - \frac{1}{2n} {\,}|xy|^2
= \frac{1}{4n} \sum_{i,j=1}^{2n} \big( |\lambda^{xy}_i| - |\lambda^{xy}_j| \big)^2 \geq 0 {\,}.$$

The causal action is defined by

$${\mathcal{S}}= \iint_{{\mathcal{F}}\times {\mathcal{F}}} {\mathcal{L}}(x,y){\,}d\rho(x){\,}d\rho(y) {\,}.$$

The causal action principle is to minimize ${\mathcal{S}}$ under variations of $\rho$ within the class of (positive) Borel measures under the following constraints:

- Boundedness constraint: $\iint_{{\mathcal{F}}\times {\mathcal{F}}} |xy|^2 {\,}d\rho(x){\,}d\rho(y) \leq C$ for some positive constant $C$.
- Trace constraint: $\;\;\;\int_{\mathcal{F}} \text{tr}(x) {\,}d\rho(x)$ is kept fixed.
- The total volume $\rho({\mathcal{F}})$ is preserved.

Here on ${\mathcal{F}}\subset {\mathrm{L}}({\mathcal{H}})$ one considers the topology induced by the $\sup$-norm on the bounded linear operators on ${\mathcal{H}}$.

The constraints prevent trivial minimizers and ensure existence, provided that ${\mathcal{H}}$ is finite-dimensional. This variational principle also makes sense in the case that the total volume $\rho({\mathcal{F}})$ is infinite if one considers variations $\delta \rho$ of bounded variation with $(\delta \rho)({\mathcal{F}})=0$.

== Inherent structures ==
In contemporary physical theories, the word spacetime refers to a Lorentzian manifold $(M,g)$. This means that spacetime is a set of points enriched by topological and geometric structures. In the context of causal fermion systems, spacetime does not need to have a manifold structure. Instead, spacetime $M$ is a set of operators on a Hilbert space (a subset of $\mathcal F$). This implies additional inherent structures that correspond to and generalize usual objects on a spacetime manifold.

For a causal fermion system $(\mathcal H, \mathcal F, \rho)$, we define spacetime $M$ as the support of the universal measure,

$$M := \text{supp} \, \rho \subset \mathcal{F}.$$

With the topology induced by $\mathcal{F}$, spacetime $M$ is a topological space.

=== Causal structure ===
For $x,y \in M$, we denote the non-trivial eigenvalues of the operator $x y$ (counting algebraic multiplicities) by $\lambda^{xy}_1, \ldots, \lambda^{xy}_{2n} \in {\mathbb{C}}$. The points $x$ and $y$ are defined to be spacelike separated if all the $\lambda^{xy}_j$ have the same absolute value. They are timelike separated if the $\lambda^{xy}_j$ do not all have the same absolute value and are all real. In all other cases, the points $x$ and $y$ are lightlike separated.

This notion of causality fits together with the "causality" of the above causal action in the sense that if two spacetime points $x,y \in M$ are space-like separated, then the Lagrangian ${\mathcal{L}}(x,y)$ vanishes. This corresponds to the physical notion of causality that spatially separated spacetime points do not interact. This causal structure is the reason for the notion "causal" in causal fermion system and causal action.

Let $\pi_x$ denote the orthogonal projection on the subspace $S_x := x({\mathcal{H}}) \subset {\mathcal{H}}$. Then the sign of the functional

$$i \text{Tr} \big( x\,  y \, \pi_x \, \pi_y - y \, x \, \pi_y \, \pi_x)$$

distinguishes the future from the past. In contrast to the structure of a partially ordered set, the relation "lies in the future of" is in general not transitive. But it is transitive on the macroscopic scale in typical examples.

=== Spinors and wave functions ===
For every $x \in M$ the spin space is defined by $S_x = x({\mathcal{H}})$; it is a subspace of ${\mathcal{H}}$ of dimension at most $2n$. The spin scalar product ${\prec} \cdot | \cdot {\succ}_x$ defined by

$${\prec}u | v {\succ}_x = -{\langle}u | x v {\rangle}_{\mathcal{H}}\qquad \text{for all } u,v \in S_x$$

is an indefinite inner product on $S_x$ of signature $(p,q)$ with $p,q \leq n$.

A wave function $\psi$ is a mapping

$$\psi {\,}:{\,}M \rightarrow {\mathcal{H}}\qquad \text{with} \qquad \psi(x) \in S_x \quad \text{for all } x \in M{\,}.$$

On wave functions for which the norm ${|\!|\!|}\cdot {|\!|\!|}$ defined by

$${|\!|\!|}\psi {|\!|\!|}^2 = \int_M \left\langle\psi(x) \bigg|\, |x|\, \psi(x) \right\rangle_{\mathcal{H}}{\,}d\rho(x)$$

is finite (where $|x|= \sqrt{x^2}$ is the absolute value of the symmetric operator $x$), one can define the inner product

$${\mathopen{<}}\psi | \phi {\mathclose{>}}= \int_M {\prec}\psi(x) | \phi(x) {\succ}_x {\,}d\rho(x) {\,}.$$

Together with the topology induced by the norm ${|\!|\!|}\cdot {|\!|\!|}$, one obtains a Krein space $({{\mathcal{K}}}, {\mathopen{<}}\cdot|\cdot {\mathclose{>}})$.

To any vector $u \in \mathcal{H}$ we can associate the wave function

$$\psi^u(x) := \pi_x u$$

(where $\pi_x : \mathcal{H} \rightarrow S_x$ is again the orthogonal projection to the spin space). This gives rise to a distinguished family of wave functions, referred to as the wave functions of the occupied states.

=== The fermionic projector ===
The kernel of the fermionic projector $P(x,y)$ is defined by

$$P(x,y) = \pi_x \,y|_{S_y} {\,}:{\,}S_y \rightarrow S_x$$

(where $\pi_x : \mathcal{H} \rightarrow S_x$ is again the orthogonal projection on the spin space, and $|_{S_y}$ denotes the restriction to $S_y$). The fermionic projector $P$ is the operator

$$P {\,}:{\,}{{\mathcal{K}}}\rightarrow {{\mathcal{K}}}{\,},\qquad (P \psi)(x) = \int_M P(x,y)\, \psi(y)\, d\rho(y){\,},$$

which has the dense domain of definition given by all vectors $\psi \in {{\mathcal{K}}}$ satisfying the conditions

$$\phi := \int_M x\, \psi(x)\, d\rho(x) {\,}\in {\,}{\mathcal{H}}\quad \text{and} \quad {|\!|\!|}\phi {|\!|\!|}< \infty{\,}.$$

As a consequence of the causal action principle, the kernel of the fermionic projector has additional normalization properties which justify the name projector.

=== Connection and curvature ===
Being an operator from one spin space to another, the kernel of the fermionic projector gives relations between different spacetime points. This fact can be used to introduce a spin connection

$$D_{x,y} \,:\, S_y \rightarrow S_x \quad \text{unitary}\,.$$

The basic idea is to take a polar decomposition of $P(x,y)$. The construction becomes more involved by the fact that the spin connection should induce a corresponding metric connection

$$\nabla_{x,y}\,:\, T_y \rightarrow T_x \quad \text{isometric}\,,$$

where the tangent space $T_x$ is a specific subspace of the linear operators on $S_x$ endowed with a Lorentzian metric. The spin curvature is defined as the holonomy of the spin connection,

$$\mathfrak{R}(x,y,z) = D_{x,y} \,D_{y,z} \,D_{z,x} \,:\, S_x \rightarrow S_x\,.$$

Similarly, the metric connection gives rise to metric curvature. These geometric structures give rise to a proposal for a quantum geometry.

=== The Euler–Lagrange equations and the linearized field equations ===
A minimizer $\rho$ of the causal action satisfies corresponding Euler–Lagrange equations. They state that the function $\ell_\kappa$ defined by

$$\ell_\kappa(x) := \int_M \big( {\mathcal{L}}_\kappa(x,y) + \kappa\, |xy|^2 \big) \, d\rho(y) \,-\, \mathfrak{s}$$

(with two Lagrange parameters $\kappa$ and $\mathfrak{s}$) vanishes and is minimal on the support of $\rho$,

$$\ell_\kappa|_M \equiv \inf_{x \in \mathcal{F}} \ell_\kappa(x) = 0 \,.$$

For the analysis, it is convenient to introduce jets ${\mathfrak{u}} := (a, u)$ consisting of a real-valued function $a$ on $M$ and a vector field $u$ on $T\mathcal{F}$ along $M$, and to denote the combination of multiplication and directional derivative by $\nabla_{\mathfrak{u}} g(x) := a(x)\, g(x) + \big(D_u g \big)(x)$. Then the Euler–Lagrange equations imply that the weak Euler–Lagrange equations

$$\nabla_{\mathfrak{u}} \ell|_M = 0$$

hold for any test jet $\mathfrak{u}$.

Families of solutions of the Euler–Lagrange equations are generated infinitesimally by a jet ${\mathfrak{v}}$ which satisfies the linearized field equations

$$\langle \mathfrak{u}, \Delta \mathfrak{v} \rangle|_M = 0 \, ,$$

to be satisfied for all test jets $\mathfrak{u}$, where the Laplacian $\Delta$ is defined by

$$\langle \mathfrak{u}, \Delta \mathfrak{v} \rangle(x) := \nabla_{\mathfrak{u}} \bigg( \int_M \big( \nabla_{1, \mathfrak{v}} + \nabla_{2, \mathfrak{v}} \big) \mathcal{L}(x,y)\, d\rho(y) - \nabla_\mathfrak{v} \mathfrak{s} \bigg) \,.$$

The Euler–Lagrange equations describe the dynamics of the causal fermion system, whereas small perturbations of the system are described by the linearized field equations.

=== Conserved surface layer integrals ===
In the setting of causal fermion systems, spatial integrals are expressed by so-called surface layer integrals. In general terms, a surface layer integral is a double integral of the form

$$\int_\Omega \bigg( \int_{M \setminus \Omega} \cdots {\mathcal{L}}(x,y) \, d\rho(y) \bigg) \, d\rho(x) \, ,$$

where one variable is integrated over a subset $\Omega \subset M$, and the other variable is integrated over the complement of $\Omega$. It is possible to express the usual conservation laws for charge, energy, ... in terms of surface layer integrals. The corresponding conservation laws are a consequence of the Euler–Lagrange equations of the causal action principle and the linearized field equations. For the applications, the most important surface layer integrals are the current integral $\gamma^\Omega_\rho(\mathfrak{v})$, the symplectic form $\sigma^\Omega_\rho(\mathfrak{u}, \mathfrak{v})$, the surface layer inner product $\langle \mathfrak{u}, \mathfrak{v}\rangle^\Omega_\rho$ and the nonlinear surface layer integral $\gamma^\Omega(\tilde{\rho}, \rho)$.

=== Bosonic Fock space dynamics ===
Based on the conservation laws for the above surface layer integrals, the dynamics of a causal fermion system as described by the Euler–Lagrange equations corresponding to the causal action principle can be rewritten as a linear, norm-preserving dynamics on the bosonic Fock space built up of solutions of the linearized field equations. In the so-called holomorphic approximation, the time evolution respects the complex structure, giving rise to a unitary time evolution on the bosonic Fock space.

=== A fermionic Fock state ===
If ${\mathcal{H}}$ has finite dimension $f$, choosing an orthonormal basis $u_1, \ldots, u_f$ of ${\mathcal{H}}$ and taking the wedge product of the corresponding wave functions

$$\big( \psi^{u_1} \wedge \cdots \wedge \psi^{u_f} \big)(x_1, \ldots, x_f)$$

gives a state of an $f$-particle fermionic Fock space. Due to the total anti-symmetrization, this state depends on the choice of the basis of ${\mathcal{H}}$ only by a phase factor. This correspondence explains why the vectors in the particle space are to be interpreted as fermions. It also motivates the name causal fermion system.

== Underlying physical principles ==
Causal fermion systems incorporate several physical principles in a specific way:

- A local gauge principle: In order to represent the wave functions in components, one chooses bases of the spin spaces. Denoting the signature of the spin scalar product at $x$ by $({\mathfrak{p}}_x, {\mathfrak{q}}_x)$, a pseudo-orthonormal basis $(\mathfrak{e}_\alpha(x))_{\alpha=1,\ldots, {\mathfrak{p}}_x+{\mathfrak{q}}_x}$ of $S_x$ is given by

$${\prec}\mathfrak{e}_\alpha | \mathfrak{e}_\beta {\succ}= s_\alpha{\,}\delta_{\alpha \beta}
\quad \text{with} \quad s_1, \ldots, s_{{\mathfrak{p}}_x} = 1,\;\; s_{{\mathfrak{p}}_x+1}, \ldots, s_{{\mathfrak{p}}_x+{\mathfrak{q}}_x} =-1 {\,}.$$

Then a wave function $\psi$ can be represented with component functions,

$$\psi(x) = \sum_{\alpha=1}^{{\mathfrak{p}}_x+{\mathfrak{q}}_x} \psi^\alpha(x){\,}\mathfrak{e}_\alpha(x) {\,}.$$

The freedom of choosing the bases $(\mathfrak{e}_\alpha(x))$ independently at every spacetime point corresponds to local unitary transformations of the wave functions,

$$\psi^\alpha(x) \rightarrow \sum_{\beta=1}^{{\mathfrak{p}}_x+{\mathfrak{q}}_x} U(x)^\alpha_\beta \,\, \psi^\beta(x)
\quad \text{with} \quad U(x)\in \text{U}({\mathfrak{p}}_x, {\mathfrak{q}}_x) {\,}.$$

These transformations have the interpretation as local gauge transformations. The gauge group is determined to be the isometry group of the spin scalar product. The causal action is gauge invariant in the sense that it does not depend on the choice of spinor bases.

- The equivalence principle: For an explicit description of spacetime one must work with local coordinates. The freedom in choosing such coordinates generalizes the freedom in choosing general reference frames in a spacetime manifold. Therefore, the equivalence principle of general relativity is respected. The causal action is generally covariant in the sense that it does not depend on the choice of coordinates.
- The Pauli exclusion principle: The fermionic Fock state associated to the causal fermion system makes it possible to describe the many-particle state by a totally antisymmetric wave function. This gives agreement with the Pauli exclusion principle.
- The principle of causality is incorporated by the form of the causal action in the sense that spacetime points with spacelike separation do not interact.

== Limiting cases ==
Causal fermion systems have mathematically sound limiting cases that give a connection to conventional physical structures.

=== Lorentzian spin geometry of globally hyperbolic spacetimes ===
Starting on any globally hyperbolic Lorentzian spin manifold $(\hat{M}, g)$ with spinor bundle $S\hat{M}$, one gets into the framework of causal fermion systems by choosing $({\mathcal{H}}, {\langle}.|. {\rangle}_{\mathcal{H}})$ as a subspace of the solution space of the Dirac equation. Defining the so-called local correlation operator $F(p)$ for $p \in \hat{M}$ by

$${\langle}\psi | F(p) \phi {\rangle}_{\mathcal{H}} = -{\prec}\psi | \phi {\succ}_p$$

(where ${\prec}\psi | \phi {\succ}_p$ is the inner product on the fibre $S_p \hat{M}$) and introducing the universal measure as the push-forward of the volume measure on $\hat{M}$,

$$\rho = F_* d\mu {\,},$$

one obtains a causal fermion system. For the local correlation operators to be well-defined, ${\mathcal{H}}$ must consist of continuous sections, typically making it necessary to introduce a regularization on the microscopic scale $\varepsilon$. In the limit $\varepsilon \searrow 0$, all the intrinsic structures on the causal fermion system (like the causal structure, connection and curvature) go over to the corresponding structures on the Lorentzian spin manifold. Thus the geometry of spacetime is encoded completely in the corresponding causal fermion systems.

=== Quantum mechanics and classical field equations ===
The Euler–Lagrange equations corresponding to the causal action principle have a well-defined limit if the spacetimes $M:=\text{supp}\, \rho$ of the causal fermion systems go over to Minkowski space. More specifically, one considers a sequence of causal fermion systems (for example with ${\mathcal{H}}$ finite-dimensional in order to ensure the existence of the fermionic Fock state as well as of minimizers of the causal action), such that the corresponding wave functions go over to a configuration of interacting Dirac seas involving additional particle states or "holes" in the seas. This procedure, referred to as the continuum limit, gives effective equations having the structure of the Dirac equation coupled to classical field equations. For example, for a simplified model involving three elementary fermionic particles in spin dimension two, one obtains an interaction via a classical axial gauge field $A$ described by the coupled Dirac– and Yang–Mills equations

$$\begin{align}
(i \partial \!\!\!/\ + \gamma^5 A \!\!\!/\ - m) \psi &= 0 \\
C_0 (\partial^k_j A^j - \Box A^k) - C_2 A^k &= 12 \pi^2 \bar \psi \gamma^5 \gamma^k \psi \,.
\end{align}$$

Taking the non-relativistic limit of the Dirac equation, one obtains the Pauli equation or the Schrödinger equation, giving the correspondence to quantum mechanics. Here $C_0$ and $C_2$ depend on the regularization and determine the coupling constant as well as the rest mass.

Likewise, for a system involving neutrinos in spin dimension 4, one gets effectively a massive $SU(2)$ gauge field coupled to the left-handed component of the Dirac spinors. The fermion configuration of the standard model can be described in spin dimension 16.

=== The Einstein field equations ===
For the just-mentioned system involving neutrinos, the continuum limit also yields the Einstein field equations coupled to the Dirac spinors,

$$R_{jk} - \frac{1}{2}\,R\, g_{jk} + \Lambda\, g_{jk} = \kappa\, T_{jk}[\Psi, A] \,,$$

up to corrections of higher order in the curvature tensor. Here the cosmological constant $\Lambda$ is undetermined, and $T_{jk}$ denotes the energy-momentum tensor of the spinors and the $SU(2)$ gauge field. The gravitation constant $\kappa$ depends on the regularization length.

=== Quantum field theory in Minkowski space ===
Starting from the coupled system of equations obtained in the continuum limit and expanding in powers of the coupling constant, one obtains integrals which correspond to Feynman diagrams on the tree level. Fermionic loop diagrams arise due to the interaction with the sea states, whereas bosonic loop diagrams appear when taking averages over the microscopic (in generally non-smooth) spacetime structure of a causal fermion system (so-called holographic mixing).
