= Felix Finster =

German mathematician

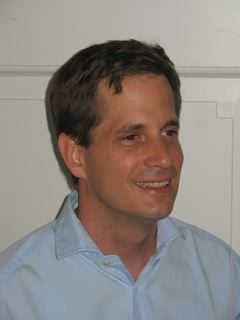
Felix Finster (2009)

Felix Finster (born 6 August 1967, in Mannheim) is a German mathematician working on problems in mathematical physics, geometry and analysis.

== Life and work ==
Finster studied physics and mathematics at Heidelberg University, where he graduated in 1992 with Franz Wegner and Claus Gerhardt. In 1992–1995 he wrote his PhD thesis at ETH Zürich with Konrad Osterwalder. In 1996–1998 he was post-doc at Harvard University. From 1998–2002 he was member of the Max Planck Institute for Mathematics in the Sciences in Leipzig. He got his habilitation in 2000 at Leipzig University. Since 2002 he is full professor of mathematics at the University of Regensburg.

Finster works mainly on mathematical problems in general relativity and quantum theory. More specifically, in collaboration with Niky Kamran, Joel Smoller and Shing-Tung Yau he studies the dynamics of waves in a black hole geometry. Moreover, he developed the fermionic projector approach to quantum field theory. In this context, he formulated the causal action principle. In recent years, the approach was extended to so-called causal fermion systems, which form a mathematical framework for describing quantum geometries.

Finster is married and has four children.

== Publications ==
- The Principle of the Fermionic Projector, AMS/IP Studies in Advanced Mathematics Series 35, American Mathematical Society, Providence, RI; International Press, Cambridge, MA, 2006, ISBN 978-0-8218-3974-4, Online.
- Finster, Kamran, Smoller, Yau: Linear waves in the Kerr geometry: A mathematical voyage to black hole physics, Bulletin of the American Mathematical Society, Volume 46, 2009, 635–659, Online.
- Causal variational principles on measure spaces, Journal für die reine und angewandte Mathematik 646, De Gruyter 2010, 141–194, Online.
- A formulation of quantum field theory realizing a sea of interacting Dirac particles, Letters in Mathematical Physics 97, Springer, 2011, 165–183, Online.
- Finster, Grotz, Schiefeneder: Causal fermion systems: A quantum space-time emerging from an action principle, in "Quantum Field Theory and Gravity", Birkhäuser, 2012, Online.
- Finster, Müller, Tolksdorf, Zeidler: Quantum Field Theory and Gravity. Conceptual and Mathematical Advances in the Search for a Unified Framework, Springer, 2012, ISBN 978-3-03480-043-3, Online.
- The Continuum Limit of Causal Fermion Systems, Fundamental Theories of Physics 186, Springer International Publishing Switzerland, 2016, ISBN 978-3-319-42066-0, Online.
- Finster, Sebastian Kindermann, Jan-Hendrik Treude: Causal Fermion Systems - An Introduction to Fundamental Structures, Methods and Applications, Cambridge Monographs on Mathematical Physics, Cambridge University Press, Cambridge, United Kingdom, 2025, ISBN 978-1-009-63262-1, Online.
