= Bernoulli's inequality =

Inequality about exponentiations of 1+x

An illustration of Bernoulli's inequality, with the graphs of $y = (1+x)^r$ and $y = 1+rx$ shown in red and blue respectively. Here, $r=3.$

In mathematics, Bernoulli's inequality (named after Jacob Bernoulli) is an inequality that approximates exponentiations of $1+x$. It is often employed in real analysis. It has several useful variants:

== Integer exponent ==
- Case 1: $(1 + x)^r \geq 1 + rx$ for every integer $r\geq 1$ and real number $x\geq-1$. The inequality is strict if $x\neq 0$ and $r\geq 2$.
- Case 2: $(1 + x)^r \geq 1 + rx$ for every integer $r\geq 0$ and every real number $x\geq -2$.
- Case 3: $(1 + x)^r \geq 1 + rx$ for every even integer $r\geq 0$ and every real number $x$.

== Real exponent ==
- $(1 + x)^r \geq 1 + rx$ for every real number $r\geq 1$ and $x\geq -1$. The inequality is strict if $x\neq 0$ and $r\neq 1$.
- $(1 + x)^r \leq 1 + rx$ for every real number $0\leq r\leq 1$ and $x\geq -1$.

== History ==
Jacob Bernoulli first published the inequality in his treatise "Positiones Arithmeticae de Seriebus Infinitis" (Basel, 1689), where he used the inequality often.

According to Joseph E. Hofmann, Über die Exercitatio Geometrica des M. A. Ricci (1963), p. 177, the inequality is actually due to Sluse in his Mesolabum (1668 edition), Chapter IV "De maximis & minimis".

== Proof for integer exponent ==
The first case has a simple inductive proof:

Suppose the statement is true for $r=k$:

$$(1+x)^k \ge 1+kx.$$

Then it follows that

$$\begin{align}
(1+x)^{k+1} &= (1+x)^k(1+x) \\
&\ge (1+kx)(1+x) \\
&=1+kx+x+kx^2 \\
&=1+x(k+1)+kx^2 \\
&\ge 1+(k+1)x
\end{align}$$

Bernoulli's inequality can be proved for case 2, in which $r$ is a non-negative integer and $x\ge-2$, using mathematical induction in the following form:

- we prove the inequality for $r\in\{0,1\}$,
- from validity for some r we deduce validity for $r+2$.

For $r=0$,

$$(1+x)^0 \ge 1+0x$$

is equivalent to $1\geq 1$ which is true.

Similarly, for $r=1$ we have

$$(1+x)^r=1+x \ge 1+rx.$$

Now suppose the statement is true for $r=k$:

$$(1+x)^k \ge 1+kx.$$

Then it follows that

$$\begin{align}
(1+x)^{k+2} &= (1+x)^k(1+x)^2 \\
&\ge (1+kx)\left(1+2x+x^2\right) \qquad\qquad\qquad\text{ by hypothesis and }(1+x)^2\ge 0 \\
&=1+2x+x^2+kx+2kx^2+kx^3 \\
&=1+(k+2)x+kx^2(x+2)+x^2 \\
&\ge 1+(k+2)x
\end{align}$$

since $x^2\ge 0$ as well as $x+2\ge0$. By the modified induction we conclude the statement is true for every non-negative integer $r$.

By noting that if $x<-2$, then $1+rx$ is negative gives case 3.

== Generalizations ==
=== Generalization of exponent ===
The exponent $r$ can be generalized to an arbitrary real number as follows: if $x>-1$, then

$$(1 + x)^r \geq 1 + rx$$

for $r\leq 0$ or $\geq 1$, and

$$(1 + x)^r \leq 1 + rx$$

for $0\leq r\leq 1$.

This generalization can be proved by convexity (see below) or by comparing derivatives. The strict versions of these inequalities require $x\neq 0$ and $r\neq 0, 1$.

The case $0 \leq r \leq 1$ can also be derived from the case $r\geq 1$ by noting that (using the main case result) $\left(1 + \frac{x}{r}\right)^{r} \geq 1 + x = \left[(1+x)^{\frac{1}{r}}\right]^r$ and by using the fact that $f(x) = x^r$ is monotonic. We can conclude that $1 + x/r \geq (1+x)^{\frac{1}{r}}$ for $r \geq 1$, therefore $(1 + x)^l \leq 1 + lx$ for $0 < l = 1/r \leq 1$. The leftover case $l = 0$ is verified separately.

=== Generalization of base ===
Instead of $(1+x)^n$ the inequality holds also in the form $(1+x_1)(1+x_2)\dots(1+x_r) \geq 1+x_1+x_2 + \dots + x_r$ where $x_1, x_2, \dots , x_r$ are real numbers, all greater than $-1$, all with the same sign. Bernoulli's inequality is a special case when $x_1 = x_2 = \dots = x_r = x$. This generalized inequality can be proved by mathematical induction.

Proof

In the first step we take $n=1$. In this case the inequality $1+x_1 \geq 1 + x_1$ is obviously true.

In the second step we assume validity of the inequality for $r$ numbers and deduce validity for $r+1$ numbers.

We assume that
$$(1+x_1)(1+x_2)\dots(1+x_r) \geq 1+x_1+x_2 + \dots + x_r$$
is valid. After multiplying both sides with a positive number $(x_{r+1} + 1)$ we get:

$$\begin{alignat}{2}
(1+x_1)(1+x_2)\dots(1+x_r)(1+x_{r+1}) \geq & (1+x_1+x_2 + \dots + x_r)(1+x_{r+1})
\\
\geq & (1+x_1+x_2+ \dots + x_r) \cdot 1 + (1+x_1+x_2+ \dots + x_r) \cdot x_{r+1}
\\
\geq & (1+x_1+x_2+ \dots + x_r) + x_{r+1} + x_1 x_{r+1} + x_2 x_{r+1} + \dots + x_r x_{r+1}
\\ \end{alignat}$$

As $x_1, x_2, \dots x_r, x_{r+1}$ all have the same sign, the products $x_1 x_{r+1}, x_2 x_{r+1}, \dots x_r x_{r+1}$ are all positive numbers. So the quantity on the right-hand side can be bounded as follows:
$$(1+x_1+x_2+ \dots + x_r) + x_{r+1} + x_1 x_{r+1} + x_2 x_{r+1} + \dots + x_r x_{r+1} \geq 1+x_1+x_2+ \dots + x_r + x_{r+1},$$
what was to be shown.

=== Strengthened version ===
The following theorem presents a strengthened version of the Bernoulli inequality, incorporating additional terms to refine the estimate under specific conditions. Let the exponent $r$ be a nonnegative integer and let $x$ be a real number with $x \ge -2$ if $r$ is odd and greater than 1. Then

$(1 + x)^{r} \geq 1 + rx + \lfloor r/2 \rfloor x^2$

with equality if and only if $r \in \{0, 1, 2\}$ or $x \in \{-2, 0\}$.

== Related inequalities ==
The following inequality estimates the $r$-th power of $1+x$ from the other side. For any real numbers $x$ and $r$ with $r >0$, one has

$$(1 + x)^r \le e^{rx},$$

where $e =$ 2.718.... This may be proved using the inequality

$$\left(1 + \frac{1}{k}\right)^k < e.$$

== Alternative form ==
An alternative form of Bernoulli's inequality for $t\geq 1$ and $0\le x\le 1$ is:

$$(1-x)^t \ge 1-xt.$$

This can be proved (for any integer $t$) by using the formula for geometric series: (using $y=1-x$)

$$t=1+1+\dots+1 \ge 1+y+y^2+\ldots+y^{t-1} = \frac{1-y^t}{1-y},$$

or equivalently $xt \ge 1-(1-x)^t.$

== Alternative proofs ==
=== Arithmetic and geometric means ===
An elementary proof for $0\le r\le 1$ and $x \ge -1$ can be given using weighted AM-GM.

Let $\lambda_1, \lambda_2$ be two non-negative real constants. By weighted AM-GM on $1,1+x$ with weights $\lambda_1, \lambda_2$ respectively, we get

$$\dfrac{\lambda_1\cdot 1 + \lambda_2\cdot (1+x)}{\lambda_1+\lambda_2}\ge \sqrt[\lambda_1+\lambda_2]{(1+x)^{\lambda_2}}.$$

Note that

$$\dfrac{\lambda_1\cdot 1 + \lambda_2\cdot (1+x)}{\lambda_1+\lambda_2}=\dfrac{\lambda_1+\lambda_2+\lambda_2x}{\lambda_1+\lambda_2}=1+\dfrac{\lambda_2}{\lambda_1+\lambda_2}x$$

and

$$\sqrt[\lambda_1+\lambda_2]{(1+x)^{\lambda_2}} = (1+x)^{\frac{\lambda_2}{\lambda_1+\lambda_2}},$$

so our inequality is equivalent to

$$1 + \dfrac{\lambda_2}{\lambda_1+\lambda_2}x \ge (1+x)^{\frac{\lambda_2}{\lambda_1+\lambda_2}}.$$

After substituting $r = \dfrac{\lambda_2}{\lambda_1+\lambda_2}$ (bearing in mind that this implies $0\le r\le 1$) our inequality turns into

$$1+rx \ge (1+x)^r$$

which is Bernoulli's inequality for $0\le r\le 1$.

The case $r\ge 1$ can be derived from $0\le r\le 1$ in the same way as the case $0\le r\le 1$ can be derived from $r\ge 1$ (see above "Generalization of exponent").

=== Geometric series ===
Bernoulli's inequality

$(1+x)^r \ge 1+rx$	1

is equivalent to

$(1+x)^r - 1-rx \ge 0,$	2

and by the formula for geometric series (using y = 1 + x) we get

$(1+x)^r - 1 = y^r-1 = \left(\sum^{r-1}_{k=0}y^k\right) \cdot (y-1) = \left(\sum^{r-1}_{k=0}(1+x)^k\right)\cdot x$	3

which leads to

$(1+x)^r - 1-rx = \left(\left(\sum^{r-1}_{k=0}(1+x)^k\right) - r\right)\cdot x = \left(\sum^{r-1}_{k=0}\left((1+x)^k-1\right)\right)\cdot x \ge 0.$	4

Now if $x \ge 0$ then, by monotony of the powers, each summand $(1+x)^k - 1 = (1+x)^k - 1^k \ge 0$, and therefore their sum is greater than $0$ and hence the product on the LHS of (4).

If $0 \ge x\ge -2$ then, by the same arguments, $1\ge(1+x)^k$ and thus all addends $(1+x)^k-1$ are non-positive and hence so is their sum. Since the product of two non-positive numbers is non-negative, we get again (4).

=== Binomial theorem ===
One can prove Bernoulli's inequality for x ≥ 0 using the binomial theorem. It is true trivially for r = 0, so suppose r is a positive integer. Then $(1+x)^r = 1 + rx + \tbinom r2 x^2 + ... + \tbinom rr x^r.$ Clearly $\tbinom r2 x^2 + ... + \tbinom rr x^r \ge 0,$ and hence $(1+x)^r \ge 1+rx$ as required.

=== Using convexity ===
For $0\neq x> -1$ the function $h(\alpha)=(1+x)^\alpha$ is strictly convex. Therefore, for $0<\alpha<1$ holds $(1+x)^\alpha=h(\alpha)=h((1-\alpha)\cdot 0+\alpha\cdot 1)<(1-\alpha) h(0)+\alpha h(1)=1+\alpha x$ and the reversed inequality is valid for $\alpha<0$ and $\alpha>1$.

Another way of using convexity is to re-cast the desired inequality to $\log (1 + x) \geq \frac{1}{r}\log( 1 + rx)$ for real $r\geq 1$ and real $x > -1/r$. This inequality can be proved using the fact that the $\log$ function is concave, and then using Jensen's inequality in the form $\log( p \, a + (1-p)b ) \geq p\log(a) + (1-p)\log(b)$ to give: $\log(1+x) = \log(\frac{1}{r}(1+rx)+\frac{r-1}{r}) \geq \frac{1}{r} \log (1+rx)+\frac{r-1}{r}\log 1 = \frac{1}{r} \log (1+rx)$ which is the desired inequality.

== See also ==
- Binomial approximation
