= Hadamard's lemma =

Theorem

In mathematics, Hadamard's lemma, named after Jacques Hadamard, is essentially a first-order form of Taylor's theorem, in which we can express a smooth, real-valued function exactly in a convenient manner.

== Statement ==
Hadamard's lemma—Let $f$ be a smooth, real-valued function defined on an open, star-convex neighborhood $U$ of a point $a$ in $n$-dimensional Euclidean space. Then $f(x)$ can be expressed, for all $x \in U,$ in the form:
$$f(x) = f(a) + \sum_{i=1}^n \left(x_i - a_i\right) g_i(x),$$
where each $g_i$ is a smooth function on $U,$ $a = \left(a_1, \ldots, a_n\right),$ and $x = \left(x_1, \ldots, x_n\right).$

=== Proof ===
Proof

Let $x \in U.$ Define $h : [0, 1] \to \R$ by
$$h(t) = f(a + t(x - a)) \qquad \text{ for all } t \in [0, 1].$$

Then
$$h'(t) = \sum_{i=1}^n \frac{\partial f}{\partial x_i}(a + t(x - a)) \left(x_i - a_i\right),$$
which implies
$$\begin{aligned}h(1) - h(0)&= \int_0^1 h'(t)\,dt\\
&= \int_0^1 \sum_{i=1}^n \frac{\partial f}{\partial x_i}(a + t(x - a)) \left(x_i - a_i\right)\, dt\\
&= \sum_{i=1}^n \left(x_i - a_i\right)\int_0^1 \frac{\partial f}{\partial x_i}(a + t(x - a))\, dt.\end{aligned}$$

But additionally, $h(1) - h(0) = f(x) - f(a),$ so by letting
$$g_i(x) = \int_0^1 \frac{\partial f}{\partial x_i}(a + t(x - a))\, dt,$$
the theorem has been proven. $\blacksquare$

== Consequences and applications ==
Corollary—If $f : \R \to \R$ is smooth and $f(0) = 0$ then $f(x)/x$ is a smooth function on $\R.$ Explicitly, this conclusion means that the function $\R \to \R$ that sends $x \in \R$ to
$$\begin{cases}
f(x)/x & \text{ if } x \neq 0 \\
\lim_{t \to 0} f(t)/t & \text{ if } x = 0 \\
\end{cases}$$
is a well-defined smooth function on $\R.$

Proof

By Hadamard's lemma, there exists some $g \in C^{\infty}(\R)$ such that $f(x) = f(0) + x g(x)$ so that $f(0) = 0$ implies $f(x)/x = g(x).$ $\blacksquare$

Corollary—If $y, z \in \R^n$ are distinct points and $f : \R^n \to \R$ is a smooth function that satisfies $f(z) = 0 = f(y)$ then there exist smooth functions $g_i, h_i \in C^{\infty}\left(\R^n\right)$ ($i = 1, \ldots, 3n - 2$) satisfying $g_i(z) = 0 = h_i(y)$ for every $i$ such that
$$f = \sum_{i}^{} g_i h_i.$$

Proof

By applying an invertible affine linear change in coordinates, it may be assumed without loss of generality that $z = (0, \ldots, 0)$ and $y = (0, \ldots, 0, 1).$ By Hadamard's lemma, there exist $g_1, \ldots, g_n \in C^{\infty}\left(\R^n\right)$ such that $f(x) = \sum_{i=1}^n x_i g_i(x).$ For every $i = 1, \ldots, n,$ let $\alpha_i := g_i(y)$ where $0 = f(y) = \sum_{i=1}^n y_i g_i(y) = g_n(y)$ implies $\alpha_n = 0.$ Then for any $x = \left(x_1, \ldots, x_n\right) \in \R^n,$
$$\begin{alignat}{8}
f(x)
&= \sum_{i=1}^n x_i g_i(x) && \\
&= \sum_{i=1}^n \left[x_i\left(g_i(x) - \alpha_i\right)\right] + \sum_{i=1}^{n-1} \left[x_i \alpha_i\right] && \quad \text{ using } g_i(x) = \left(g_i(x) - \alpha_i\right) + \alpha_i \text{ and } \alpha_n = 0 \\
&= \left[\sum_{i=1}^n x_i\left(g_i(x) - \alpha_i\right)\right] + \left[\sum_{i=1}^{n-1} x_i x_n \alpha_i\right] + \left[\sum_{i=1}^{n-1} x_i \left(1 - x_n\right) \alpha_i\right] && \quad \text{ using } x_i = x_n x_i + x_i \left(1 - x_n\right). \\
\end{alignat}$$
Each of the $3 n - 2$ terms above has the desired properties. $\blacksquare$

== See also ==
- Bump function – Smooth and compactly supported function
- Continuously differentiable – Mathematical function whose derivative exists
- Smoothness – Number of derivatives of a function (mathematics)
- Taylor's theorem – Approximation of a function by a truncated power series
