= Binomial approximation =

Approximation of powers of some binomials

The binomial approximation is useful for approximately calculating powers of sums of 1 and a small number x. It states that

$$(1 + x)^\alpha \approx 1 + \alpha x.$$

It is valid when $|x|<1$ and $|\alpha x| \ll 1$ where $x$ and $\alpha$ may be real or complex numbers.

The benefit of this approximation is that $\alpha$ is converted from an exponent to a multiplicative factor. This can greatly simplify mathematical expressions (as in the example below) and is a common tool in physics.

The approximation can be proven several ways, and is closely related to the binomial theorem. By Bernoulli's inequality, the left-hand side of the approximation is greater than or equal to the right-hand side whenever $x>-1$ and $\alpha \geq 1$.

== Derivations ==
=== Using linear approximation ===
The function

$$f(x) = (1 + x)^{\alpha}$$

is a smooth function for x near 0. Thus, standard linear approximation tools from calculus apply: one has

$$f'(x) = \alpha (1 + x)^{\alpha - 1}$$

and so

$$f'(0) = \alpha.$$

Thus

$$f(x) \approx f(0) + f'(0)(x - 0) = 1 + \alpha x.$$

By Taylor's theorem, the error in this approximation is equal to $\frac{\alpha(\alpha - 1) x^2}{2} \cdot (1 + \zeta)^{\alpha - 2}$ for some value of $\zeta$ that lies between 0 and x. For example, if $x < 0$ and $\alpha \geq 2$, the error is at most $\frac{\alpha(\alpha - 1) x^2}{2}$. In little o notation, one can say that the error is $o(|x|)$, meaning that $\lim_{x \to 0} \frac{\textrm{error}}{|x|} = 0$.

=== Using Taylor series ===
The function

$$f(x) = (1+x)^\alpha$$

where $x$ and $\alpha$ may be real or complex can be expressed as a Taylor series about the point zero.

$$\begin{align}
f(x) &= \sum_{n=0}^{\infty} \frac{f^{(n)}(0)}{n!} x^n\\
f(x) &= f(0) + f'(0) x + \frac{1}{2} f''(0) x^2 + \frac{1}{6} f'''(0) x^3 + \frac{1}{24} f^{(4)}(0) x^4 + \cdots\\
(1+x)^{\alpha} &= 1 + \alpha x + \frac{1}{2} \alpha (\alpha-1) x^2 + \frac{1}{6} \alpha (\alpha-1)(\alpha-2)x^3 + \frac{1}{24} \alpha (\alpha-1)(\alpha-2)(\alpha-3)x^4 + \cdots
\end{align}$$

If $|x| < 1$ and $|\alpha x| \ll 1$, then the terms in the series become progressively smaller and it can be truncated to

$$(1+x)^\alpha \approx 1 + \alpha x .$$

This result from the binomial approximation can always be improved by keeping additional terms from the Taylor series above. This is especially important when $|\alpha x|$ starts to approach one, or when evaluating a more complex expression where the first two terms in the Taylor series cancel (see example).

Sometimes it is wrongly claimed that $|x| \ll 1$ is a sufficient condition for the binomial approximation. A simple counterexample is to let $x=10^{-6}$ and $\alpha=10^7$. In this case $(1+x)^\alpha > 22,000$ but the binomial approximation yields $1 + \alpha x = 11$. For small $|x|$ but large $|\alpha x|$, a better approximation is:

$$(1 + x)^\alpha \approx e^{\alpha x} .$$

== Example ==
The binomial approximation for the square root, $\sqrt{1+x} \approx 1+x/2$, can be applied for the following expression,

$$\frac{1}{\sqrt{a+b}} - \frac{1}{\sqrt{a-b}}$$

where $a$ and $b$ are real but $a \gg b$.

The mathematical form for the binomial approximation can be recovered by factoring out the large term $a$ and recalling that a square root is the same as a power of one half.

$$\begin{align}
\frac{1}{\sqrt{a+b}} - \frac{1}{\sqrt{a-b}} &= \frac{1}{\sqrt{a}} \left(\left(1+\frac{b}{a}\right)^{-1/2} - \left(1-\frac{b}{a}\right)^{-1/2}\right)\\
&\approx\frac{1}{\sqrt{a}} \left(\left(1+\left(-\frac{1}{2}\right)\frac{b}{a}\right) - \left(1-\left(-\frac{1}{2}\right)\frac{b}{a}\right)\right) \\
&\approx\frac{1}{\sqrt{a}} \left(1-\frac{b}{2a} - 1 -\frac{b}{2a}\right) \\
&\approx -\frac{b}{a \sqrt{a}}
\end{align}$$

Evidently the expression is linear in $b$ when $a \gg b$ which is otherwise not obvious from the original expression.

== Generalization ==
While the binomial approximation is linear, it can be generalized to a quadratic approximation keeping the second term in the Taylor series:

$$(1+x)^\alpha \approx 1 + \alpha x + (\alpha/2) (\alpha-1) x^2$$

Applied to the square root, it results in:

$$\sqrt{1+x} \approx 1 + x/2 - x^2 / 8.$$

=== Quadratic example ===
Consider the expression:

$$(1 + \epsilon)^n - (1 - \epsilon)^{-n}$$

where $|\epsilon|<1$ and $|n \epsilon| \ll 1$. If only the linear term from the binomial approximation is kept $(1+x)^\alpha \approx 1 + \alpha x$ then the expression unhelpfully simplifies to zero

$$\begin{align}
(1 + \epsilon)^n - (1 - \epsilon)^{-n} &\approx (1+ n \epsilon) - (1 - (-n) \epsilon)\\
&\approx (1+ n \epsilon) - (1 + n \epsilon)\\
&\approx 0 .
\end{align}$$

While the expression is small, it is not exactly zero. So now, keeping the quadratic term:

$$\begin{align}
(1+\epsilon)^n - (1 - \epsilon)^{-n}&\approx \left(1+ n \epsilon + \frac{1}{2} n (n-1) \epsilon^2\right) - \left(1 + (-n)(-\epsilon) + \frac{1}{2} (-n) (-n-1) (-\epsilon)^2\right)\\
&\approx \left(1+ n \epsilon + \frac{1}{2} n (n-1) \epsilon^2\right) - \left(1 + n \epsilon + \frac{1}{2} n (n+1) \epsilon^2\right)\\
&\approx \frac{1}{2} n (n-1) \epsilon^2 - \frac{1}{2} n (n+1) \epsilon^2\\
&\approx \frac{1}{2} n \epsilon^2 ((n-1) - (n+1)) \\
&\approx - n \epsilon^2
\end{align}$$

This result is quadratic in $\epsilon$ which is why it did not appear when only the linear terms in $\epsilon$ were kept.
