= Dirac sea =

Theoretical model of the vacuum

Dirac sea for a massive particle. • particles, • antiparticles

The Dirac sea is a theoretical model of the electron vacuum as an infinite sea of electrons with negative energy. It was first postulated by the British physicist Paul Dirac in 1930 to explain the anomalous negative-energy quantum states predicted by the relativistically correct Dirac equation for electrons. The positron, the antimatter counterpart of the electron, was originally conceived of as a hole in the Dirac sea, before its experimental discovery in 1932. (Note: This was not the original intent of Dirac though, as the title of his 1930 paper (A Theory of Electrons and Protons) indicates. But it soon afterwards became clear that the mass of holes must be that of the electron.)

In hole theory, the solutions with negative time evolution factors are reinterpreted as representing the positron, discovered by Carl Anderson. The interpretation of this result requires a Dirac sea, showing that the Dirac equation is not merely a combination of special relativity and quantum mechanics, but it also implies that the number of particles cannot be conserved.

Dirac sea theory has been displaced by quantum field theory, though they are mathematically compatible.

== Origins ==
Similar ideas on holes in crystals had been developed by Soviet physicist Yakov Frenkel in 1926, but there is no indication the concept was discussed with Dirac when the two met in a Soviet physics congress in the summer of 1928.

The origins of the Dirac sea lie in the energy spectrum of the Dirac equation, an extension of the Schrödinger equation consistent with special relativity, an equation that Dirac had formulated in 1928. Although this equation was extremely successful in describing electron dynamics, it possesses a rather peculiar feature: for each quantum state possessing a positive energy E, there is a corresponding state with energy -E. This is not a big difficulty when an isolated electron is considered, because its energy is conserved and negative-energy electrons may be left out. However, difficulties arise when effects of the electromagnetic field are considered, because a positive-energy electron would be able to shed energy by continuously emitting photons, a process that could continue without limit as the electron descends into ever lower (more negative) energy states. However, real electrons clearly do not behave in this way.

Dirac's solution to this was to rely on the Pauli exclusion principle. Electrons are fermions, and obey the exclusion principle, which means that no two electrons can share a single energy state within an atom. Dirac hypothesized that what we think of as the "vacuum" is actually the state in which all the negative-energy states are filled, and none of the positive-energy states. Therefore, if we want to introduce a single electron, we would have to put it in a positive-energy state, as all the negative-energy states are occupied. Furthermore, even if the electron loses energy by emitting photons it would be forbidden from dropping below zero energy.

Dirac further pointed out that a situation might exist in which all the negative-energy states are occupied except one. This "hole" in the sea of negative-energy electrons would respond to electric fields as though it were a positively charged particle. Initially, Dirac identified this hole as a proton. However, Robert Oppenheimer pointed out that an electron and its hole would be able to annihilate each other, releasing energy on the order of the electron's rest energy in the form of energetic photons; if holes were protons, stable atoms would not exist. Hermann Weyl also noted that a hole should act as though it has the same mass as an electron, whereas the proton is about two thousand times heavier. The issue was finally resolved in 1932, when the positron was discovered by Carl Anderson, with all the physical properties predicted for the Dirac hole.

== Inelegance ==
Despite its success, the idea of the Dirac sea tends not to strike people as very elegant. The existence of the sea implies an infinite negative electric charge filling all of space. In order to make any sense out of this, one must assume that the "bare vacuum" must have an infinite positive charge density which is exactly cancelled by the Dirac sea. Since the absolute energy density is unobservable—the cosmological constant aside—the infinite energy density of the vacuum does not represent a problem. Only changes in the energy density are observable. Geoffrey Landis also notes that Pauli exclusion does not definitively mean that a filled Dirac sea cannot accept more electrons, since, as Hilbert elucidated, a sea of infinite extent can accept new particles even if it is filled. This happens when we have a chiral anomaly and a gauge instanton.

The development of quantum field theory (QFT) in the 1930s made it possible to reformulate the Dirac equation in a way that treats the positron as a "real" particle rather than the absence of a particle, and makes the vacuum the state in which no particles exist instead of an infinite sea of particles. This picture recaptures all the valid predictions of the Dirac sea, such as electron-positron annihilation. On the other hand, the field formulation does not eliminate all the difficulties raised by the Dirac sea; in particular the problem of the vacuum possessing infinite energy.

== Mathematical expression ==
Upon solving the free Dirac equation,

$$i\hbar\frac{\partial \Psi}{\partial t} = (c\hat \boldsymbol \alpha \cdot \hat \boldsymbol p + mc^2\hat \beta)\Psi,$$

one finds

$$\Psi_{\mathbf p\lambda} = N\left(\begin{matrix}U\\ \frac{(c\hat \boldsymbol \sigma \cdot \boldsymbol p)}{mc^2 + \lambda E_p}U\end{matrix}\right)\frac{\exp[i(\mathbf p \cdot \mathbf x - \varepsilon t)/\hbar]}{\sqrt{2\pi\hbar}^3},$$

where

$$\varepsilon = \pm E_p, \quad E_p = +c\sqrt{\mathbf p^2 + m^2 c^2}, \quad \lambda = \sgn \varepsilon$$

for plane wave solutions with 3-momentum p. This is a direct consequence of the relativistic energy-momentum relation

$$E^2=p^2c^2+m^2c^4$$

upon which the Dirac equation is built. The quantity U is a constant 2 × 1 column vector and N is a normalization constant. The quantity ε is called the time evolution factor, and its interpretation in similar roles in, for example, the plane wave solutions of the Schrödinger equation, is the energy of the wave (particle). This interpretation is not immediately available here since it may acquire negative values. A similar situation prevails for the Klein–Gordon equation. In that case, the absolute value of ε can be interpreted as the energy of the wave since in the canonical formalism, waves with negative ε actually have positive energy E_{p}. But this is not the case with the Dirac equation. The energy in the canonical formalism associated with negative ε is –E_{p}.

== Modern interpretation ==
The Dirac sea interpretation and the modern QFT interpretation are related by what may be thought of as a very simple Bogoliubov transformation, an identification between the creation and annihilation operators of two different free field theories. In the modern interpretation, the field operator for a Dirac spinor is a sum of creation operators and annihilation operators, in a schematic notation:

$$\psi(x) = \sum a^\dagger(k) e^{ikx} + a(k)e^{-ikx}$$

An operator with negative frequency lowers the energy of any state by an amount proportional to the frequency, while operators with positive frequency raise the energy of any state.

In the modern interpretation, the positive frequency operators add a positive energy particle, adding to the energy, while the negative frequency operators annihilate a positive energy particle, and lower the energy. For a fermionic field, the creation operator $a^\dagger(k)$ gives zero when the state with momentum k is already filled, while the annihilation operator $a(k)$ gives zero when the state with momentum k is empty.

But then it is possible to reinterpret the annihilation operator as a creation operator for a negative energy particle. It still lowers the energy of the vacuum, but in this point of view it does so by creating a negative energy object. This reinterpretation only affects the philosophy. To reproduce the rules for when annihilation in the vacuum gives zero, the notion of "empty" and "filled" must be reversed for the negative energy states. Instead of being states with no antiparticle, these are states that are already filled with a negative energy particle.

The price is that there is a nonuniformity in certain expressions, because replacing annihilation with creation adds a constant to the negative energy particle number. The number operator for a Fermi field is:

$$N = a^\dagger a = 1 - a a^\dagger$$

which means that if one replaces N by 1−N for negative energy states, there is a constant shift in quantities like the energy and the charge density, quantities that count the total number of particles. The infinite constant gives the Dirac sea an infinite energy and charge density. The vacuum charge density should be zero, since the vacuum is Lorentz invariant, but this is artificial to arrange in Dirac's picture. The way it is done is by passing to the modern interpretation.

Dirac's idea is more directly applicable to solid state physics, where the valence band in a solid can be regarded as a "sea" of electrons. Holes in this sea indeed occur, and are extremely important for understanding the effects of semiconductors, though they are never referred to as "positrons". Unlike in particle physics, there is an underlying positive charge—the charge of the ionic lattice—that cancels out the electric charge of the sea.

== Revival in the theory of causal fermion systems ==
Dirac's original concept of a sea of particles was revived in the theory of causal fermion systems, a recent proposal for a unified physical theory. In this approach, the problems of the infinite vacuum energy and infinite charge density of the Dirac sea disappear because these divergences drop out of the physical equations formulated via the causal action principle. These equations do not require a preexisting space-time, making it possible to realize the concept that space-time and all structures therein arise as a result of the collective interaction of the sea states with each other and with the additional particles and "holes" in the sea.

== See also ==
- Fermi sea
- Positronium
- Vacuum polarization
- Virtual particle
