= Kurt Sitte =

German university teacher (1910–1993)

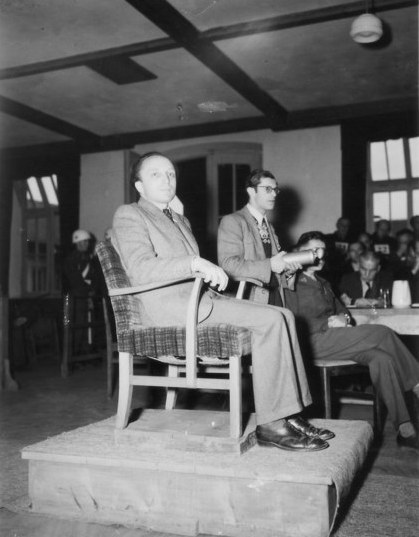
- Kurt Sitte, witness for the prosecution, at the Buchenwald War Crimes Trial, Dachau, 1947, April 16
- Born: 1 December 1910; Reichenberg, North Bohemia, Austro-Hungary
- Died: 30 June 1993 (aged 82); Freiburg, Baden-Württemberg, Germany
- Occupations: nuclear physicist convicted spy
- Spouse(s): 1. Kheda Kraus; 2. Judith Krymokowski
- Children: 1. Martin Sitte; 2. _____ Sitte

Kurt Sitte (1 December 1910 - 20 June 1993) was a nuclear physicist, originally from northern Bohemia.

As a result of frontier changes, he grew up, after 1919, in Czechoslovakia, and from 1938 found himself a citizen of an enlarged Germany. It was primarily because of his political activism that he was detained at the Buchenwald concentration camp between September 1939 and April 1944. Having survived this internment, his scientific skills opened up a range of career options internationally: between 1945 he lived and worked successively in Scotland, England, the United States, Brazil and Israel.

Kurt Sitte was arrested on espionage charges on 15 June 1960 and, as Israel's first convicted spy, spent the next three and a half years in prison. Early release, in March 1963, resulted from his "good behaviour", at which point he was quoted as saying that he would be "glad" to continue to work in Israel, but shortly after this he took West German citizenship and relocated to Freiburg where he pursued his academic career at the university.

== Life ==
=== Provenance and early years ===
Kurt Sitte was born in Reichenberg, a mid-sized city in North Bohemia that had industrialised and grown rapidly during the previous century. Even after the termination of Austro-Hungary and the transfer of Reichenberg to the new state of Czechoslovakia in 1919, Reichenberg remained ethnically, linguistically and culturally a German city right up till 1944/45. Kurt Sitte's father, also called Kurt Sitte, was a head teacher and a painter. After completing his Abitur (school leaving exams), Kurt Sitte moved on to the Charles-Ferdinand (German) University in Prague where he studied Maths and Physics, and where he obtained his doctorate in 1932. His habilitation, which was in Physics, followed just three years later, in 1935, after which he took a teaching position. He also presided over a leftist discussion group known as "Die Tat" ("the deed") back in Reichenberg and participated in the Sudeten German Anti-Nazi Resistance movement. At the time of the Sudeten Crisis (and shortly before the Munich Agreement), Kurt Sitte was a co-founder, on 18 September 1938, of the "National Council of all Peace motivated Sudeten Germans" ("Nationalrats aller friedenswilligen Sudetendeutschen").

At some point around 1938 Kurt Sitte married Kheda/ [Hedvika or Hedwig] Kraus, a nurse working in Prague who was also from Reichenberg. The marriage would end in divorce. His wife remarried in 1958.

=== Buchenwald ===
In March 1939, soon after Czechoslovakia had been annexed to Germany, Sitte was expelled from the university and arrested. He was imprisoned briefly in Prague and then moved to the Dachau concentration camp before he, as a "political detainee", was transferred to Buchenwald in September 1939. His wife was later sent to Theresienstadt and from there to the Ravensbrück concentration camp on Dec. 20, 1943. Sitte was not Jewish, but his wife was, in part.

Early in 1942 Sitte began working in the SS-Pathology department at the concentration camp where he was employed as a deputy to the "Kapo" Gustav Wegerer. Wegerer was a chemical engineer, and according to Eugen Kogon, who was also held at Buchenwald and survived, Wegerer and Sitte provided training courses on medical and biological topics to interested fellow inmates. Another beneficiary of their erudition was the concentration camp doctor, Waldemar Hoven who during this time obtained a doctorate with a dissertation entitled "Investigations into the treatment of pulmonary tuberculosis through the inhalation of colloidal carbon" ("Versuche zur Behandlung der Lungentuberkulose durch Inhalation von Kohlekolloid"). It subsequently transpired that the dissertation had been compiled by Wegerer and Sitte.

As the end of the war approached, on 11 April 1945 Kurt Sitte was one of those freed from the Buchenwald concentration camp by members of the United States Army. His wife had also survived incarceration in Ravensbrück concentration camp.

=== After the war ===
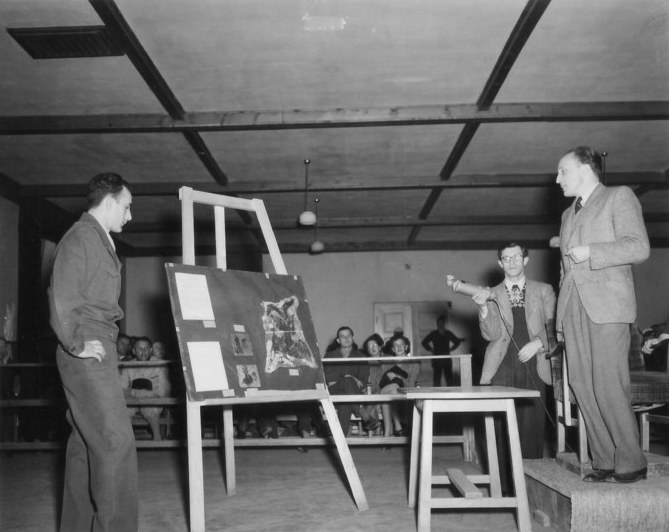
Kurt Sitte identifies human skin taken from dead prisoners at the trial of former camp personnel and prisoners from Buchenwald, 1947, 16 April

Between 1946 and 1948 Sitte and his wife lived in Britain where he was employed as a university research fellow at Edinburgh and Manchester. Their son Martin was born in 1946.

Starting in April 1947 Sitte appeared as a witness at the Buchenwald Trial. He identified examples of "processed" human skin from the camp. He testified that the principal processes had taken place at Buchenwald, based on intended uses decided elsewhere. His evidence affected the so-called "Buchenwald Commander", Ilse Koch, whose death sentence was subsequently reduced to a four-year jail term because no incriminating evidence was produced that she had selected prisoners for murder according to the tattoos on their skin, nor that she was in possession of any objects made from human skin. The US military tribunal which reduced her sentence in 1948 based its decision on various considerations, taking the view that her earlier conviction and sentencing had been excessively dependent on hearsay evidence. In this connection Sitte later found himself being questioned about his experiences at Buchenwald by an enquiry commission of the US senate. The senators had got hold of a shrunken head from Buchenwald, and Sitte was able to confirm that it was indeed a human head and that it was one of two shrunken heads formerly in the collection of the SS-Pathology department at the concentration camp. The heads were those of two camp internees who in 1939 or 1940 had attempted to escape from Buchenwald but been caught. They had been physically punished before an assembly of their fellow inmates and later hanged. Even in the context of those times, the power to shock of the testimony Sitte was able to provide stands out.

In 1948 he relocated to the United States, taking a position as a professor of physics at Syracuse University. Here he embarked on research in nuclear physics and cosmic radiation. In 1953 he became a member of the New York Academy of Sciences. In the age of McCarthyism, Sitte was the object of official suspicion during his years in the United States, both because of his left-wing politics in the 1930s and because of the contacts he maintained with Czechoslovak communists whom he knew from his time in Buchenwald, and whom he continued to visit even after the Communist take-over in 1948. It was at the instigation of the FBI that in 1953 Sitte's residence permit was not renewed, and he accordingly relocated again, this time to Brazil. He took a teaching post as a visiting professor at the University of São Paulo. Shortly afterwards his inclusion on a list of security risks was confirmed when he booked a flight to Rome that included a transfer in New York City. When Sitte asked if he might stay at a hotel overnight the New York authorities refused his request, placed him under a heavy police guard, and bundled him onto the first available flight out of the country, which took him not to Italy, but back to Brazil.

=== Israeli espionage conviction ===
By 1954 Kurt Sitte had become widely respected as an expert in nuclear physics, and in October he accepted a post at the Israel Institute of Technology ("Technion") in Haifa, where he set up the Nuclear Physics department and became its head. Further official recognition followed in 1955 with his appointment as the president of the Israeli Physics Society. Because of his various offices and duties he also acquired knowledge of research projects in nuclear physics at the Weizmann Institute just outside Tel Aviv and at the Hebrew University of Jerusalem.

Sitte was also entrusted with overseas research contracts, including space projects of the US Air Force. In 1959 he became deputy chief of the supervisory council of the research institute which was dominated by US, British and Canadians, and in this way he became familiar with the practical evaluation of the space research that was undertaken there. Because of his exposed position Sitte was subject to surveillance by the Israeli Intelligence Services. He drew suspicion through his visits to communist Czechoslovakia and because of two stays in the Soviet Union. More brazen still, from the start of the 1960s, was a series of conspiratorial meetings with a blacklisted (by Israeli intelligence) Czechoslovak diplomat in various cafés. Early in June 1960 Sitte asked his staff to produce written reports on their research projects.

In the end Sitte was arrested at his villa in Haifa on 15 June 1960 and the property was searched. His arrest was based on the allegation that he had betrayed state secrets to an (unnamed) foreign power. In the interrogation that followed Sitte admitted to his contacts with Czechoslovak diplomats. His sister and aging mother were still living in Czechoslovakia, and he testified that he had been keen to protect their positions, and that conversations involving scientific matters had simply involved the free exchange of information among scientists. The Israeli intelligence services reported that Sitte had been afraid that his research on cosmic rays as a potential energy source could lead to a confrontation between the United States and the Soviet Union. It was in order to prevent such an outcome that he had divulged information to the Soviets. The actual trial was launched in the Haifa district court on 5 November 1960. The public were excluded, but it is known that the secret trial involved crimes against the Israeli National Security Act of 1957. On 7 February Kurt Sitte was sentenced to a five-year jail term for passing on secret information to a foreign power. The sentence was appealed, but without success. However, because of "good behaviour" he was released early, on 26 March 1963.

=== Professor in Freiburg ===
In 1963 Kurt Sitte married, as his second wife, Judith Sitte-Amon (born Judith/Yehudit Krymokowski) and the couple relocated to West Germany. The couple had a son.

Between 1963 and 1971 Sitte was a professor (initially a visiting professor) at the Albert-Ludwig University of Freiburg in the southwest of the country. He combined this, between 1964 and 1967, with work at the Max Planck Institute for Nuclear Physics in Heidelberg. Between 1970 and 1983 he belonged to the scientific committee of the Cosmo-Geophysical Laboratory of the Italian National Research Council, based in Turin, where he had been employed as a teaching professor between 1966 and 1970. He was also the author of numerous scientific papers.
