= Negative energy =

Concept in physics

Negative energy is a concept used in physics to explain the nature of certain fields, including the gravitational field and various quantum field effects.

== Gravitational energy ==
Gravitational energy, or gravitational potential energy, is the potential energy a massive object has because it is within a gravitational field. In classical mechanics, two or more masses always have a gravitational potential. Conservation of energy requires that this gravitational field energy is always negative, so that it is zero when the objects are infinitely far apart. As two objects move apart and the distance between them approaches infinity, the gravitational force between them approaches zero from the positive side of the real number line and the gravitational potential approaches zero from the negative side. Conversely, as two massive objects move towards each other, the motion accelerates under gravity causing an increase in the (positive) kinetic energy of the system and, in order to conserve the total sum of energy, the increase of the same amount in the gravitational potential energy of the object is treated as negative.

A universe in which positive energy dominates will eventually collapse in a Big Crunch, while an "open" universe in which negative energy dominates will either expand indefinitely or eventually disintegrate in a Big Rip. In the zero-energy universe model ("flat" or "Euclidean"), the total amount of energy in the universe is exactly zero: its amount of positive energy in the form of matter is exactly cancelled out by its negative energy in the form of gravity. It is unclear which, if any, of these models accurately describes the real universe.

=== Black hole ergosphere ===
For a classically rotating black hole, the rotation creates an ergosphere outside the event horizon, in which spacetime itself begins to rotate, in a phenomenon known as frame-dragging. Since the ergosphere is outside the event horizon, particles can escape from it. Within the ergosphere, a particle's energy may become negative (via the relativistic rotation of its Killing vector). The negative-energy particle then crosses the event horizon into the black hole, with the law of conservation of energy requiring that an equal amount of positive energy should escape.

In the Penrose process, a body divides in two, with one half gaining negative energy and falling in, while the other half gains an equal amount of positive energy and escapes. This is proposed as the mechanism by which the intense radiation emitted by quasars is generated.

== Quantum field effects ==
Negative energies and negative energy density are consistent with quantum field theory.

=== Virtual particles ===
In quantum theory, the uncertainty principle allows the vacuum of space to be filled with virtual particle-antiparticle pairs which appear spontaneously and exist for only a short time before, typically, annihilating themselves again. Some of these virtual particles can have negative energy. This behaviour plays a role in several important phenomena, as described below.

=== Casimir effect ===
In the Casimir effect, two flat plates placed very close together restrict the wavelengths of quanta which can exist between them. This in turn restricts the types and hence number and density of virtual particle pairs which can form in the intervening vacuum and can result in a negative energy density. Since this restriction does not exist or is much less significant on the opposite sides of the plates, the forces outside the plates are greater than those between the plates. This causes the plates to appear to pull on each other, which has been measured. More accurately, the vacuum energy caused by the virtual particle pairs is pushing the plates together, and the vacuum energy between the plates is too small to negate this effect since fewer virtual particles can exist per unit volume between the plates than can exist outside them.

=== Squeezed light ===
It is possible to arrange multiple beams of laser light such that destructive quantum interference suppresses the vacuum fluctuations. Such a squeezed vacuum state involves negative energy. The repetitive waveform of light leads to alternating regions of positive and negative energy.

=== Dirac sea ===
According to the theory of the Dirac sea, developed by Paul Dirac in 1930, the vacuum of space is full of negative energy. This theory was developed to explain the anomaly of negative-energy quantum states predicted by the Dirac equation. A year later, after work by Weyl, the negative energy concept was abandoned and replaced by a theory of antimatter. The following year, 1932, saw the discovery of the positron by Carl Anderson.

=== Schrödinger equation ===
For energy eigenstates of the Schrödinger equation, the wavefunction is wavelike wherever the particle's energy is greater than the local potential, and exponential-like (evanescent) wherever it is less. Naively, this would imply kinetic energy is negative in evanescent regions (to cancel the local potential). However, kinetic energy is an operator in quantum mechanics, and its expectation value is always positive, summing with the expectation value of the potential energy to yield the energy eigenvalue.

For wavefunctions of particles with zero rest mass (such as photons), this means that any evanescent portions of the wavefunction would be associated with a local negative mass–energy. However, the Schrödinger equation does not apply to massless particles; instead the Klein–Gordon equation is required.

== Quantum gravity phenomena ==
The intense gravitational fields around black holes create phenomena which are attributed to both gravitational and quantum effects. In these situations, a particle's Killing vector may be rotated such that its energy becomes negative.

=== Hawking radiation ===
Virtual particles can exist for a short period. When a pair of such particles appears next to a black hole's event horizon, one of them may get drawn in. This rotates its Killing vector so that its energy becomes negative and the pair have no net energy. This allows them to become real and the positive particle escapes as Hawking radiation, while the negative-energy particle reduces the black hole's net energy. Thus, a black hole may slowly evaporate.

== Speculative suggestions ==
=== Wormholes ===
Negative energy appears in the speculative theory of wormholes, where it is needed to keep the wormhole open. A wormhole directly connects two locations which may be separated arbitrarily far apart in both space and time, and in principle allows near-instantaneous travel between them. However physicists such as Roger Penrose regard such ideas as unrealistic, more fiction than speculation.

=== Warp drive ===
A theoretical principle for a faster-than-light (FTL) warp drive for spaceships has been suggested, using negative energy. The Alcubierre drive is based on a solution to the Einstein field equations of general relativity in which a "bubble" of spacetime is constructed using a hypothetical negative energy. The bubble is then moved by expanding space behind it and shrinking space in front of it. The bubble may travel at arbitrary speeds and is not constrained by the speed of light. This does not contradict general relativity, as the bubble's contents do not actually move through their local spacetime.

=== Negative-energy particles ===
Speculative theoretical studies have suggested that particles with negative energies are consistent with Relativistic quantum theory, with some noting interrelationships with negative mass and/or time reversal.

== See also ==
- Antimatter
- Dark energy
- Dark matter
- Negative mass
- Negative pressure
