= Essential spectrum =

Aspect of mathematical spectrum theory

In mathematics, the essential spectrum of a bounded operator (or, more generally, of a densely defined closed linear operator) is a certain subset of its spectrum, defined by a condition of the type that says, roughly speaking, "fails badly to be invertible".

== Of self-adjoint operators ==
In formal terms, let $X$ be a Hilbert space and let $T$ be a self-adjoint operator on $X$.

=== Definition ===
The essential spectrum of $T$, usually denoted $\sigma_{\mathrm{ess}}(T)$, is the set of all real numbers $\lambda \in \R$ such that

$$T-\lambda I_X$$

is not a Fredholm operator, where $I_X$ denotes the identity operator on $X$, so that $I_X(x)=x$, for all $x \in X$. (An operator is Fredholm if it is bounded, and its kernel and cokernel are finite-dimensional.)

The definition of essential spectrum $\sigma_{\mathrm{ess}}(T)$ will remain unchanged if we allow it to consist of all those complex numbers $\lambda \in \C$ (instead of just real numbers) such that the above condition holds. This is due to the fact that the spectrum of a self-adjoint operator is real.

=== Properties ===
The essential spectrum is always closed, and it is a subset of the spectrum $\sigma(T)$. As mentioned above, since $T$ is self-adjoint, the spectrum is contained on the real axis.

The spectrum can be partitioned into two parts. One part is the essential spectrum. The other part is the discrete spectrum, which is the set of points $\lambda \in \sigma(T)$ such that it is an isolated point, and $\ker(\lambda I_X - T)$ is a finite dimensional subspace. That is, it is an isolated eigenvalue of finite algebraic multiplicity (normal eigenvalues).

The essential spectrum is invariant under compact perturbations. That is, if $K$ is a compact self-adjoint operator on $X$, then the essential spectra of $T$ and that of $T+K$ coincide, i.e. $\sigma_{\mathrm{ess}}(T)=\sigma_{\mathrm{ess}}(T+K)$. This explains why it is called the essential spectrum: Weyl (1910) originally defined the essential spectrum of a certain differential operator to be the spectrum independent of boundary conditions.

=== The discrete spectrum ===
The essential spectrum $\sigma_{\mathrm{ess}}(T)$ is a subset of the spectrum $\sigma(T)$ and its complement is called the discrete spectrum, so

$$\sigma_{\mathrm{disc}}(T) = \sigma(T) \setminus \sigma_{\mathrm{ess}}(T)$$.

If $T$ is self-adjoint, then, by definition, a number $\lambda$ is in the discrete spectrum $\sigma_{\mathrm{disc}}$ of $T$ if it is an isolated eigenvalue of finite multiplicity, meaning that the dimension of the space

$$\ \mathrm{span} \{ \psi \in X : T\psi = \lambda\psi \}$$

has finite but non-zero dimension and that there is an $\varepsilon>0$ such that $\mu \in \sigma(T)$ and $|\mu-\lambda|<\varepsilon$ imply that $\mu$ and $\lambda$ are equal. (For general, non-self-adjoint operators $S$ on Banach spaces, by definition, a complex number $\lambda \in \C$ is in the discrete spectrum $\sigma_{\mathrm{disc}}(S)$ if it is a normal eigenvalue; or, equivalently, if it is an isolated point of the spectrum and the rank of the corresponding Riesz projector is finite.)

=== Weyl's criterion ===
Define the following:

- A vector is a unit vector iff it has norm 1.
- A sequence of vectors $(\psi_n)_n$ converge (strongly) to 0 iff $\lim_n \|\psi_n\| = 0$. This is written as $\psi_n \to 0$.
- A sequence of vectors $(\psi_n)_n$ converge weakly to 0 iff $\lim_n \langle\psi_n, v\rangle = 0$ for any $v \in X$. This is written as $\psi_n \xrightarrow{w} 0$.

Under these definitions, we have the following characterization of the spectrum $\sigma(T)$ of the operator $T$:

A number $\lambda$ is in $\sigma(T)$ if and only if there exists a sequence of unit vectors $(\psi_n)_n$ with $(T - \lambda) \psi_n \to 0$.

If $\lambda$ is on the discrete spectrum, then since $\lambda$ is isolated in $\sigma(T)$, any sequence of unit vectors $(\psi_n)_n$ with $(T - \lambda) \psi_n \to 0$ must converge to $\ker(\lambda I-T)$, and since $\ker(\lambda I-T)$ is finite-dimensional, $\psi_n$ must have a convergent subsequence by compactness of the unit sphere of $\ker(\lambda I-T)$. Therefore, $\psi_n \not\xrightarrow{w} 0$. Weyl's criterion states that the converse is true as well:

A number $\lambda$ is in $\sigma_{\mathrm{ess}}(T)$ if and only if there exists a sequence of unit vectors $(\psi_n)_n$ with $(T - \lambda) \psi_n \to 0$, and $\psi_n \xrightarrow{w} 0$.

Such a sequence is called a singular sequence or Weyl sequence. By sparsifying the sequence and applying Gram–Schmidt process, the sequence can be made orthonormal.

=== Examples ===
Let $T: L^2[0, 1] \to L^2[0, 1]$ be the multiplication operator (or the position operator) defined by $(Tf)(x) = xf(x)$. The essential range of $x \mapsto x$ is $[0, 1]$, so the spectrum is $\sigma(T) = [0, 1]$. For any $\lambda \in [0, 1]$, we can explicitly construct a singular sequence as a sequence of increasingly narrow and sharp rectangular functions that are supported on disjoint sets. For example, let $\lambda = 0$, then we can construct $\psi_n$ to be the rectangular function on $[2^{-n}, 2^{-n+1}]$ of height $\sqrt{2^n}$. They are orthonormal, with $\|(T-\lambda)\psi_n\| = O(1/2^{2n}) \to 0$. Note that the sequence increasingly resembles the Dirac delta "function" at 0, even though it does not converge.

Let $T: L^2(\R) \to L^2(\R)$ be the momentum operator defined by extending $T = -i\frac{d}{dx}$ for compactly supported smooth functions. Its essential spectrum is the entire real line. Physicists say that each $k \in \R$ is an eigenvalue of $T$ with eigenfunction $e^{ikx}$. However, this is not technically correct, since $e^{ikx}$ has infinite L2-norm. Nevertheless, it is possible to make a similar rigorous statement. While $e^{ikx}$ is not in $L^2(\R)$, it can be approached by a Weyl sequence in $L^2(\R)$. The construction is essentially the same, by constructing a sequence approaching the Dirac delta at $k$ in momentum space, then performing a Fourier transform to position space.

Let $T: H^2(\R^n) \to H^2(\R^n)$ be the Laplace operator $T = -\Delta$, where $H^2$ is the Sobolev space. Its essential spectrum is $[0, \infty)$. For each $\lambda \in [0, \infty)$, and any unit vector $\hat k$, the construction of the Weyl sequence for the "eigenfunction" $e^{i\sqrt{\lambda}\hat k \cdot x}$ is similar.

== Of densely defined operators ==
=== Preliminary concepts ===
Let $X$ be a Banach space, and let $T$ be a densely defined operator on $X$. That is, it is of type $T:\,D(T)\to X$, where $D(T)$ is a dense subspace of $X$. Let the spectrum of $T$ be $\sigma(T)$, defined by
$$\sigma(T) = \{\lambda : (\lambda I - T) \text{ has no bounded inverse}\}$$
The complement of $\sigma(T)$ is the resolvent set of $T$.

=== Definitions ===
There are several definitions of the essential spectrum of $T$, which are not necessarily the same. Each of these definitions is of the form
$$\sigma_{\mathrm{ess}}(T) = \{\lambda : (\lambda I - T) \text{ is not nice}\}$$
There are at least 5 different levels of niceness, increasing in strength. Each increase in strength shrinks the set of nice $\lambda$, thus expands the essential domain.

Let $A$ denote an operator of type $A: D(T)\to X$. Let $\ker A$ be its kernel, $\operatorname{coker} A$ be its cokernel, $\operatorname{ran} A$ be its range. We say that $A$ is:

1. Normally solvable, if $A$ is a closed operator, and $\operatorname{ran} A$ is a closed set. This can be checked via the closed range theorem.
2. Semi-Fredholm, if furthermore, $\ker A$ is finite-dimensional inclusive-or $\operatorname{coker} A$ is finite-dimensional.
3. Fredholm, if furthermore, $\ker A$ is finite-dimensional and $\operatorname{coker} A$ is finite-dimensional.
4. Fredholm with index zero, if furthermore, $\ker A$ and $\operatorname{coker} A$ has the same dimension.
5. If furthermore, there exists a deleted neighborhood of zero that is a subset of the resolvent set.
  - In other words, zero is not a limit point of $\sigma(A)$.
6. Has bounded inverse, if there exists a bounded linear operator $A^{-1}: X \to D(T)$, such that $A, A^{-1}$ are inverses of each other.

Now, set $A = (\lambda I - T)$. Then conditions 1 to 5 defines 5 essential spectra $\sigma_{\mathrm{ess},k}(T)$, $1\le k\le 5$, and condition 6 defines the spectrum $\sigma(T)$. It is clear that conditions 1 to 5 increases in strength. One can also show that condition 6 is stronger than condition 5. Thus,
$$\sigma_{\mathrm{ess},1}(T) \subseteq \sigma_{\mathrm{ess},2}(T) \subseteq \sigma_{\mathrm{ess},3}(T) \subseteq \sigma_{\mathrm{ess},4}(T) \subseteq \sigma_{\mathrm{ess},5}(T) \subseteq \sigma(T) \subseteq \C,$$
Any of these inclusions may be strict.

Different authors defined the essential spectra differently, resulting in different terminologies. For example, Kato used $\sigma_{\mathrm{ess},2}$, Wolf used $\sigma_{\mathrm{ess},3}$, Schechter used $\sigma_{\mathrm{ess},4}$, Browder used $\sigma_{\mathrm{ess},5}$. Thus, $\sigma_{\mathrm{ess},5}$ is also called the Browder essential spectrum, etc.

=== More definitions ===
There are even more definitions of the essential spectrum.

The following definition states that the essential spectrum is the part of the spectrum that is stable under compact perturbation:
$$w(T) := \bigcap_{B \text{ is compact}} \sigma(T+B)$$
Another definition states that:
$$\sigma_l(T) = \sigma(T) \setminus \{\text{isolated eigenvalues of }T\text{ with finite multiplicity}\}$$
Given $\lambda \in \C$, it is an isolated eigenvalue of $T$ with finite multiplicity if and only if $\ker(\lambda I - T)$ has positive finite dimension, and $\lambda$ is an isolated point of $\sigma(T)$.

=== Equalities ===
==== Banach space case ====
1. If $T$ is not closed, then $\sigma_{\mathrm{ess},1}(T) = \C$. Because of this, the essential spectrum is uninteresting for these, and we will assume thenceforth that $T$ is closed.
2. If $T$ is bounded and either hypernormal or Toeplitz, then $\sigma_{\mathrm{ess},4}(T) = \sigma_{\mathrm{ess},5}(T)$.
3. If $T$ is bounded and $\sigma_{\mathrm{ess},2}(T)$, then $\sigma_{\mathrm{ess},2}(T) = \sigma_{\mathrm{ess},5}(T)$.
4. $\sigma_{\mathrm{ess},k}(T') = \sigma_{\mathrm{ess},k}(T)$ for all $k=1,2,3,4,5$, where $T'$ is the transpose operator of $T$.
5. Define the radius of the essential spectrum by $r_{\mathrm{ess},k}(T) = \max \{ |\lambda| : \lambda\in\sigma_{\mathrm{ess},k}(T) \}.$ Even though the spectra may be different, the radius is the same for all $k=1,2,3,4,5$.
6. The essential spectrum $\sigma_{\mathrm{ess},k}(T)$ is invariant under compact perturbations for $k=1,2,3,4$, but not for $k=5$. That is, for $k=1,2,3,4$ and any compact operator $B$, $\sigma_{\mathrm{ess},k}(T+B) = \sigma_{\mathrm{ess},k}(T)$. The 4th essential spectrum is in fact the maximal possible that is stable under compact perturbations, in the sense that $\sigma_{\mathrm{ess},4}(T) = w(T)$. (D.E. Edmunds and W.D. Evans, 1987).
7. $\sigma_{\mathrm{ess}, 5}(T) = \sigma_l (T)$.
8. $\sigma(T)=\sigma_{\mathrm{ess},5}(T)\bigsqcup\sigma_{\mathrm{disc}}(T)$, where $\sigma_{\mathrm{disc}}(T)$ is the discrete spectrum of $T$.

The definition of the set $\sigma_{\mathrm{ess},2}(T)$ is equivalent to Weyl's criterion: $\sigma_{\mathrm{ess},2}(T)$ is the set of all $\lambda$ for which there exists a singular sequence.

==== Hilbert space case ====
If $X$ is a Hilbert space, and $T$ is self-adjoint, then all the above definitions of the essential spectrum coincide, except $\sigma_{\mathrm{ess},1}(T)$. Concretely, we have
$$\sigma_{\mathrm{ess},1}(T) \subseteq \sigma_{\mathrm{ess},2}(T) = \sigma_{\mathrm{ess},3}(T) = \sigma_{\mathrm{ess},4}(T) = \sigma_{\mathrm{ess},5}(T)$$
The issue is that $\sigma_{\mathrm{ess},1}(T)$ does not include isolated eigenvalues of infinite multiplicity. For example, if $T = I$ and $X$ is infinite-dimensional, then $\sigma_{\mathrm{ess},1}(T)$ is empty, whereas $\sigma(T) = \{1\}$. This is because 1 is an eigenvalue of the identity operator with infinite multiplicity.

If $X$ is a Hilbert space, then $\sigma_{\mathrm{ess},k}(T^*) = \overline{ \sigma_{\mathrm{ess},k}(T) }$ for all $k=1,2,3,4,5$.

== See also ==
- Spectrum (functional analysis)
- Resolvent formalism
- Decomposition of spectrum (functional analysis)
- Discrete spectrum (mathematics)
- Spectrum of an operator
- Operator theory
- Fredholm theory
