= List of things named after Hermann Weyl =

This is a list of topics named after Hermann Weyl, the influential German mathematician from the 20th century.

== Mathematics and physics ==
- Cartan–Weyl theory
  - Cartan–Weyl basis
- Courant–Fischer–Weyl min-max principle
- De Donder–Weyl theory
- Hodge−Weyl decomposition
- Majorana–Weyl spinor
- Peter–Weyl theorem
- Schur–Weyl duality
- Weyl–Berry conjecture
- Weyl–Groenewold product
- Wigner–Weyl transform
- Weyl algebra
- Weyl almost periodic functions
- Weyl anomaly
- Weyl basis of the gamma matrices
- Weyl chamber
- Weyl character formula
  - Weyl denominator formula
  - Weyl dimension formula
  - Weyl–Kac character formula
- Weyl curvature: see Weyl tensor
- Weyl curvature hypothesis
- Weyl dimension formula, a specialization of the character formula
- Weyl distance function
- Weyl equation, a relativistic wave equation
- Weyl expansion
- Weyl fermion
- Weyl gauge
- Weyl gravity
- Weyl group
  - Length of a Weyl group element
  - Restricted Weyl group
- Weyl integral
- Weyl integration formula
- Weyl law
- Weyl metrics
- Weyl module
- Weyl notation
- Weyl quantization
- Weyl relations
- Weyl scalar
- Weyl semimetal
- Weyl sequence
- Weyl spinor
  - Weyl representation
- Weyl sum, a type of exponential sum
- Weyl symmetry: see Weyl transformation
- Weyl tensor
- Weyl transform
- Weyl transformation
- Weyl vector of a compact Lie group
- Weyl–Brauer matrices
- Weyl−Lewis−Papapetrou coordinates
- Weyl–Schouten theorem
- Weyl–von Neumann theorem
- Weyl-squared theories
- Weyl's axioms
- Weyl's construction
- Weyl's criterion for essential spectrum
- Weyl's criterion for equidistribution
- Weyl's inequality
- Weyl's inequality (number theory)
- Weyl's infinitesimal geometry
- Weyl's lemma: several results, for example;
  - Weyl's lemma on the "very weak" form of the Laplace equation
  - Weyl's lemma on hypoellipticity
  - Weyl's paradox (properly the Grelling–Nelson paradox)
- Weyl's postulate
- Weyl's theorem on complete reducibility
- Weyl's tile argument
- Weyl–Titchmarsh–Kodaira theory
- Weyl's tube formula
- Weyl's unitary trick

== Other ==
- Weyl (crater)
- Hermann Weyl Prize
