= Discrete spectrum (mathematics) =

Set of isolated points in the spectrum of an operator with finite-rank Riesz projectors

In mathematics, specifically in spectral theory, a discrete spectrum of a closed linear operator is defined as the set of isolated points of its spectrum such that the rank of the corresponding Riesz projector is finite.

The discrete spectrum can also be defined as the set of normal eigenvalues.

== Definition ==
A point $\lambda\in\C$ in the spectrum $\sigma(A)$ of a closed linear operator $A:\,\mathfrak{B}\to\mathfrak{B}$ in the Banach space $\mathfrak{B}$ with domain $\mathfrak{D}(A)\subset\mathfrak{B}$ is said to belong to the discrete spectrum $\sigma_{\mathrm{d}}(A)$ of $A$ if the following two conditions are satisfied:

1. $\lambda$ is an isolated point in $\sigma(A)$;
2. The rank of the corresponding Riesz projector $P_\lambda=\frac{1}{2\pi\mathrm{i}}\oint_\Gamma(z I_{\mathfrak{B}} - A)^{-1}\,dz$ is finite.

Here, $I_{\mathfrak{B}}$ is the identity operator in the Banach space $\mathfrak{B}$, and $\Gamma\subset\C$ is a simple closed counterclockwise-oriented curve bounding an open region $\Omega\subset\C$ such that $\lambda$ is the only point of the spectrum of $A$ in the closure of $\Omega$; that is, $\sigma(A)\cap\overline{\Omega}=\{\lambda\}.$

== Normal eigenvalues ==
The set of points in the discrete spectrum is equal to the set of normal eigenvalues.

$$\sigma_{\mathrm{d}}(A)=\{\mbox{normal eigenvalues of }A\}.$$

=== Root lineal ===
Let $\mathfrak{B}$ be a Banach space. Consider a partially defined linear operator $A:\,\mathfrak{B}\to\mathfrak{B}$ with domain $\mathfrak{D}(A)$. The root lineal $\mathfrak{L}_\lambda(A)$ corresponding to an eigenvalue $\lambda\in\sigma_p(A)$ is defined as the set of elements $x$ such that $x, (A-\lambda I_{\mathfrak{B}}) x, (A-\lambda I_{\mathfrak{B}})^2 x, \dots$ all belong to $\mathfrak{D}(A)$, and that after finitely many steps, we end up with zero: $(A-\lambda I_{\mathfrak{B}})^k x = 0$.

This set is a linear manifold but is not necessarily closed. If it is closed (for example, when it is finite-dimensional), it is called the generalized eigenspace of $A$ corresponding to the eigenvalue $\lambda$.

=== Normal eigenvalue ===
An eigenvalue $\lambda\in\sigma_p(A)$ of a closed linear operator $A:\,\mathfrak{B}\to\mathfrak{B}$ in the Banach space $\mathfrak{B}$ with domain $\mathfrak{D}(A)\subset\mathfrak{B}$ is called normal (in the original terminology, $\lambda$ corresponds to a normally splitting finite-dimensional root subspace) if the following two conditions are satisfied:

1. The algebraic multiplicity of $\lambda$ is finite: $\nu=\dim\mathfrak{L}_\lambda(A)<\infty$, where $\mathfrak{L}_\lambda(A)$ is the root lineal of $A$ corresponding to the eigenvalue $\lambda$;
2. The space $\mathfrak{B}$ can be decomposed into a direct sum $\mathfrak{B}=\mathfrak{L}_\lambda(A)\oplus \mathfrak{N}_\lambda$, where $\mathfrak{N}_\lambda$ is an invariant subspace of $A$ in which $A-\lambda I_{\mathfrak{B}}$ has a bounded inverse.

=== Equivalent characterizations ===
Equivalent characterizations —Let $A:\,\mathfrak{B}\to\mathfrak{B}$ be a closed linear densely defined operator in the Banach space $\mathfrak{B}$, then the following are equivalent:

1. $\lambda\in\sigma(A)$ is a normal eigenvalue;
2. $\lambda\in\sigma(A)$ is an isolated point in $\sigma(A)$ and $A-\lambda I_{\mathfrak{B}}$ is semi-Fredholm;
3. $\lambda\in\sigma(A)$ is an isolated point in $\sigma(A)$ and $A-\lambda I_{\mathfrak{B}}$ is Fredholm;
4. $\lambda\in\sigma(A)$ is an isolated point in $\sigma(A)$ and $A-\lambda I_{\mathfrak{B}}$ is Fredholm of index zero;
5. $\lambda\in\sigma(A)$ is an isolated point in $\sigma(A)$ and the rank of the corresponding Riesz projector $P_\lambda$ is finite;
6. $\lambda\in\sigma(A)$ is an isolated point in $\sigma(A)$, its algebraic multiplicity $\nu=\dim\mathfrak{L}_\lambda(A)$ is finite, and the range of $A-\lambda I_{\mathfrak{B}}$ is closed.

In all such cases, the root lineal $\mathfrak{L}_\lambda(A)$ is closed, and equals the range of the Riesz projector.

== Relation to other spectra ==
=== Isolated eigenvalues of finite algebraic multiplicity ===
In general, the rank of the Riesz projector can be larger than the dimension of the root lineal $\mathfrak{L}_\lambda$ of the corresponding eigenvalue, and in particular it is possible to have $\mathrm{dim}\,\mathfrak{L}_\lambda<\infty$, $\mathrm{rank}\,P_\lambda=\infty$. So, there is the following inclusion:

$$\sigma_{\mathrm{d}}(A)\subset\{\mbox{isolated points of the spectrum of }A\mbox{ with finite algebraic multiplicity}\}.$$

In particular, for a quasinilpotent operator

$$Q:\,l^2(\N)\to l^2(\N),\qquad Q:\,(a_1,a_2,a_3,\dots)\mapsto (0,a_1/2,a_2/2^2,a_3/2^3,\dots),$$

one has $\mathfrak{L}_\lambda(Q)=\{0\}$, $\mathrm{rank}\,P_\lambda=\infty$. Therefore, $\lambda=0$ is an isolated eigenvalue of finite algebraic multiplicity, but it is not in the discrete spectrum: $\sigma(Q)=\{0\}$, $\sigma_{\mathrm{d}}(Q)=\emptyset$.

=== Point spectrum ===
The discrete spectrum $\sigma_{\mathrm{d}}(A)$ of an operator $A$ is not to be confused with the point spectrum $\sigma_{\mathrm{p}}(A)$, which is defined as the set of eigenvalues of $A$. Each point of the discrete spectrum is an eigenvalue, so

$$\sigma_{\mathrm{d}}(A)\subset\sigma_{\mathrm{p}}(A).$$

However, they may be unequal. An eigenvalue may not be an isolated point of the spectrum, or it may be isolated, but with an infinite-rank Riesz projector. For example, for the left shift operator, $L:\,l^2(\N)\to l^2(\N), \quad L:\,(a_1,a_2,a_3,\dots)\mapsto (a_2,a_3,a_4,\dots),$ the point spectrum is the open unit disc $\mathbb{D}_1$ in the complex plane, the full spectrum is the closed unit disc $\overline{\mathbb{D}_1}$, and the discrete spectrum is empty:

$$\sigma_{\mathrm{p}}(L)=\mathbb{D}_1,
\qquad
\sigma(L)=\overline{\mathbb{D}_1},
\qquad
\sigma_{\mathrm{d}}(L)=\emptyset.$$

This is because $\sigma_{\mathrm{p}}(L)$ has no isolated points.

=== Spectral decomposition ===
The spectrum of a closed operator $A:\,\mathfrak{B}\to\mathfrak{B}$ in a Banach space $\mathfrak{B}$ can be decomposed into the union of two disjoint sets: the discrete spectrum and the fifth type of the essential spectrum (see page for the definition of each type):

$$\sigma(A)= \sigma_{\mathrm{d}}(A)\cup\sigma_{\mathrm{ess}, 5}(A).$$

== See also ==
- Spectrum (functional analysis)
- Essential spectrum
- Point spectrum
- Resolvent formalism
- Fredholm operator
