= Multiplication operator =

Linear operator scaling by a fixed function

In operator theory, a multiplication operator is a linear operator T_{f} defined on some vector space of functions and whose value at a function φ is given by multiplication by a fixed function f. That is,
$$T_f\varphi(x) = f(x) \varphi (x) \quad$$
for all φ in the domain of T_{f}, and all x in the domain of φ (which is the same as the domain of f).

Multiplication operators generalize the notion of operator given by a diagonal matrix. More precisely, one of the results of operator theory is a spectral theorem that states that every self-adjoint operator on a Hilbert space is unitarily equivalent to a multiplication operator on an L^{2} space.

These operators are often contrasted with composition operators, which are similarly induced by any fixed function f. They are also closely related to Toeplitz operators, which are compressions of multiplication operators on the circle to the Hardy space.

== Properties ==
- A multiplication operator $T_f$ on $L^2(X)$, where X is $\sigma$-finite, is bounded if and only if f is in $L^\infty(X)$. (The backward direction of the implication does not require the $\sigma$-finiteness assumption.) In this case, its operator norm is equal to $\|f\|_\infty$.
- The adjoint of a multiplication operator $T_f$ is $T_\overline{f}$, where $\overline{f}$ is the complex conjugate of f. As a consequence, $T_f$ is self-adjoint if and only if f is real-valued.
- The spectrum of a bounded multiplication operator $T_f$ is the essential range of f; outside of this spectrum, the inverse of $(T_f - \lambda)$ is the multiplication operator $T_{\frac{1}{f - \lambda}}.$
- Two bounded multiplication operators $T_f$ and $T_g$ on $L^2$ are equal if f and g are equal almost everywhere.

== Example ==
Consider the Hilbert space X = L^{2}[−1, 3] of complex-valued square integrable functions on the interval [−1, 3]. With f(x) = x^{2}, define the operator
$$T_f\varphi(x) = x^2 \varphi (x)$$
for any function φ in X. This will be a self-adjoint bounded linear operator, with domain all of X = L^{2}[−1, 3] and with norm 9. Its spectrum will be the interval [0, 9] (the range of the function x↦ x^{2} defined on [−1, 3]). Indeed, for any complex number λ, the operator T_{f} − λ is given by
$$(T_f - \lambda)(\varphi)(x) = (x^2-\lambda) \varphi(x).$$

It is invertible if and only if λ is not in [0, 9], and then its inverse is
$$(T_f - \lambda)^{-1}(\varphi)(x) = \frac{1}{x^2-\lambda} \varphi(x),$$
which is another multiplication operator.

This example can be easily generalized to characterizing the norm and spectrum of a multiplication operator on any L^{p} space.

== See also ==
- Shift operator
- Transfer operator
- Decomposition of spectrum (functional analysis)

== Bibliography ==
- Conway, J. B. (1990). A Course in Functional Analysis. Graduate Texts in Mathematics. Vol. 96. Springer Verlag. ISBN 0-387-97245-5.
