= Decomposition of spectrum (functional analysis) =

Construction in functional analysis, useful to solve differential equations

The spectrum of a linear operator $T$ that operates on a Banach space $X$ is a fundamental concept of functional analysis. The spectrum consists of all scalars $\lambda$ such that the operator $T-\lambda$ does not have a bounded inverse on $X$. The spectrum has a standard decomposition into three parts:

- a point spectrum, consisting of the eigenvalues of $T$;
- a continuous spectrum, consisting of the scalars that are not eigenvalues but make the range of $T-\lambda$ a proper dense subset of the space;
- a residual spectrum, consisting of all other scalars in the spectrum.

This decomposition is relevant to the study of differential equations, and has applications to many branches of science and engineering. A well-known example from quantum mechanics is the explanation for the discrete spectral lines and the continuous band in the light emitted by excited atoms of hydrogen.

== Decomposition into point spectrum, continuous spectrum, and residual spectrum ==
=== For bounded Banach space operators ===
Let X be a Banach space, B(X) the family of bounded operators on X, and T ∈ B(X). By definition, a complex number λ is in the spectrum of T, denoted σ(T), if T − λ does not have an inverse in B(X).

If T − λ is one-to-one and onto, i.e. bijective, then its inverse is bounded; this follows directly from the open mapping theorem of functional analysis. So, λ is in the spectrum of T if and only if T − λ is not one-to-one or not onto. One distinguishes three separate cases:

1. T − λ is not injective. That is, there exist two distinct elements x,y in X such that (T − λ)(x) = (T − λ)(y). Then z = x − y is a non-zero vector such that T(z) = λz. In other words, λ is an eigenvalue of T in the sense of linear algebra. In this case, λ is said to be in the point spectrum of T, denoted σ_{p}(T).
2. T − λ is injective, and its range is a dense subset R of X; but is not the whole of X. In other words, there exists some element x in X such that (T − λ)(y) can be as close to x as desired, with y in X; but is never equal to x. It can be proved that, in this case, T − λ is not bounded below (i.e. it sends far apart elements of X too close together). Equivalently, the inverse linear operator (T − λ)^{−1}, which is defined on the dense subset R, is not a bounded operator, and therefore cannot be extended to the whole of X. Then λ is said to be in the continuous spectrum, σ_{c}(T), of T.
3. T − λ is injective but does not have dense range. That is, there is some element x in X and a neighborhood N of x such that (T − λ)(y) is never in N. In this case, the map (T − λ)^{−1} x → x may be bounded or unbounded, but in any case does not admit a unique extension to a bounded linear map on all of X. Then λ is said to be in the residual spectrum of T, σ_{r}(T).

So σ(T) is the disjoint union of these three sets,
$$\sigma(T) = \sigma_p (T) \cup \sigma_c (T) \cup \sigma_r (T).$$
The complement of the spectrum $\sigma(T)$ is known as resolvent set $\rho(T)$ that is $\rho(T)=\mathbb{C}\setminus\sigma(T)$.

Surjectivity of T − λ	Injectivity of T − λ		
Surjectivity of T − λ	Injective and bounded below	Injective but not bounded below	not injective
Surjective	Resolvent set ρ(T)	Nonexistent	Point spectrum σ_{p}(T)
Not surjective but has dense range	Nonexistent	Continuous spectrum σ_{c}(T)	Point spectrum σ_{p}(T)
Does not have dense range	Residual spectrum σ_{r}(T)		Point spectrum σ_{p}(T)

In addition, when T − λ does not have dense range, whether is injective or not, then λ is said to be in the compression spectrum of T, σ_{cp}(T). The compression spectrum consists of the whole residual spectrum and part of point spectrum.

=== For unbounded operators ===
The spectrum of an unbounded operator can be divided into three parts in the same way as in the bounded case, but because the operator is not defined everywhere, the definitions of domain, inverse, etc. are more involved.

=== Examples ===
==== Multiplication operator ====
Given a σ-finite measure space (S, Σ, μ), consider the Banach space L^{p}(μ). A function h: S → C is called essentially bounded if h is bounded μ-almost everywhere. An essentially bounded h induces a bounded multiplication operator T_{h} on L^{p}(μ):
$$(T_h f)(s) = h(s) \cdot f(s).$$

The operator norm of T is the essential supremum of h. The essential range of h is defined in the following way: a complex number λ is in the essential range of h if for all ε > 0, the preimage of the open ball B_{ε}(λ) under h has strictly positive measure. We will show first that σ(T_{h}) coincides with the essential range of h and then examine its various parts.

If λ is not in the essential range of h, take ε > 0 such that h^{−1}(B_{ε}(λ)) has zero measure. The function g(s) = 1/(h(s) − λ) is bounded almost everywhere by 1/ε. The multiplication operator T_{g} satisfies T_{g} · (T_{h} − λ) = (T_{h} − λ) · T_{g} = I. So λ does not lie in spectrum of T_{h}. On the other hand, if λ lies in the essential range of h, consider the sequence of sets {S_{n} = h^{−1}(B_{1/n}(λ))}. Each S_{n} has positive measure. Let f_{n} be the characteristic function of S_{n}. We can compute directly
$$\| (T_h - \lambda) f_n \|_p ^p = \| (h - \lambda) f_n \|_p ^p = \int_{S_n} | h - \lambda \; |^p d \mu
\leq \frac{1}{n^p} \; \mu(S_n) = \frac{1}{n^p} \| f_n \|_p ^p.$$

This shows T_{h} − λ is not bounded below, therefore not invertible.

If λ is such that μ( h^{−1}({λ})) > 0, then λ lies in the point spectrum of T_{h} as follows. Let f be the characteristic function of the measurable set h^{−1}(λ), then by considering two cases, we find
$$\forall s \in S, \; (T_h f)(s) = \lambda f(s),$$
so λ is an eigenvalue of T_{h}.

Any λ in the essential range of h that does not have a positive measure preimage is in the continuous spectrum of T_{h}. To show this, we must show that T_{h} − λ has dense range. Given f ∈ L^{p}(μ), again we consider the sequence of sets {S_{n} = h^{−1}(B_{1/n}(λ))}. Let g_{n} be the characteristic function of S − S_{n}. Define
$$f_n(s) = \frac{1}{ h(s) - \lambda} \cdot g_n(s) \cdot f(s).$$

Direct calculation shows that f_{n} ∈ L^{p}(μ), with $\| f_n\|_p\leq n \|f\|_p$. Then by the dominated convergence theorem,
$$(T_h - \lambda) f_n \rightarrow f$$
in the L^{p}(μ) norm.

Therefore, multiplication operators have no residual spectrum. In particular, by the spectral theorem, normal operators on a Hilbert space have no residual spectrum.

==== Shifts ====
In the special case when S is the set of natural numbers and μ is the counting measure, the corresponding L^{p}(μ) is denoted by l^{p}. This space consists of complex valued sequences {x_{n}} such that
$$\sum_{n \geq 0} | x_n |^p < \infty.$$

For 1 < p < ∞, l ^{p} is reflexive. Define the left shift T : l ^{p} → l ^{p} by
$$T(x_1, x_2, x_3, \dots) = (x_2, x_3, x_4, \dots).$$

T is a partial isometry with operator norm 1. So σ(T) lies in the closed unit disk of the complex plane.

T* is the right shift (or unilateral shift), which is an isometry on l ^{q}, where 1/p + 1/q = 1:
$$T^*(x_1, x_2, x_3, \dots) = (0, x_1, x_2, \dots).$$

For λ ∈ C with |λ| < 1,
$$x = (1, \lambda, \lambda ^2, \dots) \in l^p$$
and T x = λ x. Consequently, the point spectrum of T contains the open unit disk. Now, T* has no eigenvalues, i.e. σ_{p}(T*) is empty. Thus, invoking reflexivity and the theorem in Spectrum_(functional_analysis)#Spectrum_of_the_adjoint_operator (that σ_{p}(T) ⊂ σ_{r}(T*) ∪ σ_{p}(T*)), we can deduce that the open unit disk lies in the residual spectrum of T*.

The spectrum of a bounded operator is closed, which implies the unit circle, { |λ| = 1 } ⊂ C, is in σ(T). Again by reflexivity of l ^{p} and the theorem given above (this time, that σ_{r}(T) ⊂ σ_{p}(T*)), we have that σ_{r}(T) is also empty. Therefore, for a complex number λ with unit norm, one must have λ ∈ σ_{p}(T) or λ ∈ σ_{c}(T). Now if |λ| = 1 and
$$T x = \lambda x, \qquad i.e. \; (x_2, x_3, x_4, \dots) = \lambda (x_1, x_2, x_3, \dots),$$
then
$$x = x_1 (1, \lambda, \lambda^2, \dots),$$
which cannot be in l ^{p}, a contradiction. This means the unit circle must lie in the continuous spectrum of T.

So for the left shift T, σ_{p}(T) is the open unit disk and σ_{c}(T) is the unit circle, whereas for the right shift T*, σ_{r}(T*) is the open unit disk and σ_{c}(T*) is the unit circle.

For p = 1, one can perform a similar analysis. The results will not be exactly the same, since reflexivity no longer holds.

== Self-adjoint operators on Hilbert space ==
Hilbert spaces are Banach spaces, so the above discussion applies to bounded operators on Hilbert spaces as well. A subtle point concerns the spectrum of T*. For a Banach space, T* denotes the transpose and σ(T*) = σ(T). For a Hilbert space, T* normally denotes the adjoint of an operator T ∈ B(H), not the transpose, and σ(T*) is not σ(T) but rather its image under complex conjugation.

For a self-adjoint T ∈ B(H), the Borel functional calculus gives additional ways to break up the spectrum naturally.

=== Borel functional calculus ===
This subsection briefly sketches the development of this calculus. The idea is to first establish the continuous functional calculus, and then pass to measurable functions via the Riesz–Markov–Kakutani representation theorem. For the continuous functional calculus, the key ingredients are the following:

1. If T is self-adjoint, then for any polynomial P, the operator norm satisfies
  $$\| P(T) \| = \sup_{\lambda \in \sigma(T)} |P(\lambda)|.$$
2. The Stone–Weierstrass theorem, which implies that the family of polynomials (with complex coefficients), is dense in C(σ(T)), the continuous functions on σ(T).

The family C(σ(T)) is a Banach algebra when endowed with the uniform norm. So the mapping
$$P \rightarrow P(T)$$
is an isometric homomorphism from a dense subset of C(σ(T)) to B(H). Extending the mapping by continuity gives f(T) for f ∈ C(σ(T)): let P_{n} be polynomials such that P_{n} → f uniformly and define f(T) = lim P_{n}(T). This is the continuous functional calculus.

For a fixed h ∈ H, we notice that
$$f \rightarrow \langle h, f(T) h \rangle$$
is a positive linear functional on C(σ(T)). According to the Riesz–Markov–Kakutani representation theorem a unique measure μ_{h} on σ(T) exists such that
$$\int_{\sigma(T)} f \, d \mu_h = \langle h, f(T) h \rangle.$$

This measure is sometimes called the spectral measure associated to h. The spectral measures can be used to extend the continuous functional calculus to bounded Borel functions. For a bounded function g that is Borel measurable, define, for a proposed g(T)
$$\int_{\sigma(T)} g \, d \mu_h = \langle h, g(T) h \rangle.$$

Via the polarization identity, one can recover (since H is assumed to be complex)
$$\langle k, g(T) h \rangle.$$
and therefore g(T) h for arbitrary h.

In the present context, the spectral measures, combined with a result from measure theory, give a decomposition of σ(T).

=== Decomposition into absolutely continuous, singular continuous, and pure point ===
Let h ∈ H and μ_{h} be its corresponding spectral measure on σ(T). According to a refinement of Lebesgue's decomposition theorem, μ_{h} can be decomposed into three mutually singular parts:
$$\mu_h = \mu_{\mathrm{ac}} + \mu_{\mathrm{sc}} + \mu_{\mathrm{pp}}$$
where μ_{ac} is absolutely continuous with respect to the Lebesgue measure, μ_{sc} is singular with respect to the Lebesgue measure and atomless, and μ_{pp} is a pure point measure.

All three types of measures are invariant under linear operations. Let H_{ac} be the subspace consisting of vectors whose spectral measures are absolutely continuous with respect to the Lebesgue measure. Define H_{pp} and H_{sc} in analogous fashion. These subspaces are invariant under T. For example, if h ∈ H_{ac} and k = T h. Let χ be the characteristic function of some Borel set in σ(T), then
$$\langle k, \chi(T) k \rangle = \int_{\sigma(T)} \chi(\lambda) \cdot \lambda^2 d \mu_{h}(\lambda) = \int_{\sigma(T)} \chi(\lambda) \; d \mu_k(\lambda).$$
So
$$\lambda^2  d \mu_{h} = d \mu_{k}$$
and k ∈ H_{ac}. Furthermore, applying the spectral theorem gives
$$H = H_{\mathrm{ac}} \oplus H_{\mathrm{sc}} \oplus H_{\mathrm{pp}}.$$

This leads to the following definitions:

1. The spectrum of T restricted to H_{ac} is called the absolutely continuous spectrum of T, σ_{ac}(T).
2. The spectrum of T restricted to H_{sc} is called its singular spectrum, σ_{sc}(T).
3. The set of eigenvalues of T is called the pure point spectrum of T, σ_{pp}(T).

The closure of the eigenvalues is the spectrum of T restricted to H_{pp}. (Note: Alternatively, the pure point spectrum can be considered as the closure of the point spectrum, i.e. $\sigma_{pp}=\overline{\sigma_p}$) So
$$\sigma(T) = \sigma_{\mathrm{ac}}(T) \cup \sigma_{\mathrm{sc}}(T) \cup {\bar \sigma_{\mathrm{pp}}(T)}.$$

=== Comparison ===
A bounded self-adjoint operator on Hilbert space is, a fortiori, a bounded operator on a Banach space. Therefore, one can also apply to T the decomposition of the spectrum that was achieved above for bounded operators on a Banach space. Unlike the Banach space formulation, the union
$$\sigma(T) = {\bar \sigma_{\mathrm{pp}}(T)} \cup \sigma_{\mathrm{ac}}(T) \cup \sigma_{\mathrm{sc}}(T)$$
need not be disjoint. It is disjoint when the operator T is of uniform multiplicity, say m, i.e. if T is unitarily equivalent to multiplication by λ on the direct sum
$$\bigoplus _{i = 1} ^m L^2(\mathbb{R}, \mu_i)$$
for some Borel measures $\mu_i$. When more than one measure appears in the above expression, we see that it is possible for the union of the three types of spectra to not be disjoint. If λ ∈ σ_{ac}(T) ∩ σ_{pp}(T), λ is sometimes called an eigenvalue embedded in the absolutely continuous spectrum.

When T is unitarily equivalent to multiplication by λ on
$$L^2(\mathbb{R}, \mu),$$
the decomposition of σ(T) from Borel functional calculus is a refinement of the Banach space case.

=== Quantum mechanics ===
The preceding comments can be extended to the unbounded self-adjoint operators since Riesz-Markov holds for locally compact Hausdorff spaces.

In quantum mechanics, observables are (often unbounded) self-adjoint operators and their spectra are the possible outcomes of measurements.

The pure point spectrum corresponds to bound states in the following way:

- A quantum state is a bound state if and only if it is finitely normalizable for all times $t\in\mathbb{R}$.
- An observable has pure point spectrum if and only if its eigenstates form an orthonormal basis of $H$.

A particle is said to be in a bound state if it remains "localized" in a bounded region of space. Intuitively one might therefore think that the "discreteness" of the spectrum is intimately related to the corresponding states being "localized". However, a careful mathematical analysis shows that this is not true in general. For example, consider the function

$$f(x) = \begin{cases}
n & \text{if }x \in \left[n, n+\frac{1}{n^4}\right] \\
0 & \text{else}
\end{cases}, \quad \forall n \in \mathbb{N}.$$

This function is normalizable (i.e. $f\in L^2(\mathbb{R})$) as

$$\int_{n}^{n+\frac{1}{n^4}}n^2\,dx = \frac{1}{n^2} \Rightarrow \int_{-\infty}^{\infty} |f(x)|^2\,dx = \sum_{n=1}^\infty \frac{1}{n^2}.$$

Known as the Basel problem, this series converges to $\frac{\pi^2}{6}$. Yet, $f$ increases as $x \to \infty$, i.e., the state "escapes to infinity". The phenomena of Anderson localization and dynamical localization describe when the eigenfunctions are localized in a physical sense. Anderson Localization means that eigenfunctions decay exponentially as $x \to \infty$. Dynamical localization is more subtle to define.

Sometimes, when performing quantum mechanical measurements, one encounters "eigenstates" that are not localized, e.g., quantum states that do not lie in L^{2}(R). These are free states belonging to the absolutely continuous spectrum. In the spectral theorem for unbounded self-adjoint operators, these states are referred to as "generalized eigenvectors" of an observable with "generalized eigenvalues" that do not necessarily belong to its spectrum. Alternatively, if it is insisted that the notion of eigenvectors and eigenvalues survive the passage to the rigorous, one can consider operators on rigged Hilbert spaces.

An example of an observable whose spectrum is purely absolutely continuous is the position operator of a free particle moving on the entire real line. Also, since the momentum operator is unitarily equivalent to the position operator, via the Fourier transform, it has a purely absolutely continuous spectrum as well.

The singular spectrum correspond to physically impossible outcomes. It was believed for some time that the singular spectrum was something artificial. However, examples such as the almost Mathieu operator and random Schrödinger operators have shown that all types of spectra arise naturally in physics.

== Decomposition into essential spectrum and discrete spectrum ==
Let $A:\,X\to X$ be a closed operator defined on the domain $D(A)\subset X$ which is dense in X. Then there is a decomposition of the spectrum of A into a disjoint union,
$$\sigma(A)=\sigma_{\mathrm{ess},5}(A)\sqcup\sigma_{\mathrm{d}}(A),$$
where

1. $\sigma_{\mathrm{ess},5}(A)$ is the fifth type of the essential spectrum of A (if A is a self-adjoint operator, then $\sigma_{\mathrm{ess},k}(A)=\sigma_{\mathrm{ess}}(A)$ for all $1\le k\le 5$);
2. $\sigma_{\mathrm{d}}(A)$ is the discrete spectrum of A, which consists of normal eigenvalues, or, equivalently, of isolated points of $\sigma(A)$ such that the corresponding Riesz projector has a finite rank. It is a proper subset of the point spectrum, i.e., $\sigma_d(A)\subset\sigma_p(A)$, as the set of eigenvalues of A need not necessarily be isolated points of the spectrum.

== See also ==
- Point spectrum, the set of eigenvalues.
- Essential spectrum, spectrum of an operator modulo compact perturbations.
- Discrete spectrum (mathematics), the set of normal eigenvalues.
- Spectral theory of normal C*-algebras
- Spectrum (functional analysis)
