= Weyl's criterion =

Weyl's criterion may refer to:

- Equidistributed sequence#Weyl's criterion in uniform distribution theory
- Essential spectrum#Weyl's criterion in spectral theory
