= Von Neumann's theorem =

In mathematics, von Neumann's theorem is a result in the operator theory of linear operators on Hilbert spaces.

== Statement of the theorem ==
Let $G$ and $H$ be Hilbert spaces, and let $T : \operatorname{dom}(T) \subseteq G \to H$ be an unbounded operator from $G$ into $H.$ Suppose that $T$ is a closed operator and that $T$ is densely defined, that is, $\operatorname{dom}(T)$ is dense in $G.$ Let $T^* : \operatorname{dom}\left(T^*\right) \subseteq H \to G$ denote the adjoint of $T.$ Then $T^* T$ is also densely defined, and it is self-adjoint. That is, $\left(T^* T\right)^* = T^* T$ and the operators on the right- and left-hand sides have the same dense domain in $G.$
