= Closed range theorem =

Mathematical theorem about Banach spaces

In the mathematical theory of Banach spaces, the closed range theorem gives necessary and sufficient conditions for a closed densely defined operator to have closed range.

The theorem was proved by Stefan Banach in his 1932 Théorie des opérations linéaires.

== Statement ==
Let $X$ and $Y$ be Banach spaces, $T : D(T) \to Y$ a closed linear operator whose domain $D(T)$ is dense in $X,$ and $T'$ the transpose of $T$. The theorem asserts that the following conditions are equivalent:

- $R(T),$ the range of $T,$ is closed in $Y.$
- $R(T'),$ the range of $T',$ is closed in $X',$ the dual of $X.$
- $R(T) = N(T')^\perp = \left\{ y \in Y : \langle x^*,y \rangle = 0 \quad {\text{for all}}\quad x^* \in N(T') \right\}.$
- $R(T') = N(T)^\perp = \left\{x^* \in X' : \langle x^*,y \rangle = 0 \quad {\text{for all}}\quad y \in N(T) \right\}.$

Where $N(T)$ and $N(T')$ are the null space of $T$ and $T'$, respectively.

Note that there is always an inclusion $R(T)\subseteq N(T')^\perp$, because if $y=Tx$ and $x^*\in N(T')$, then $\langle x^*,y\rangle = \langle T'x^*,x\rangle = 0$. Likewise, there is an inclusion $R(T')\subseteq N(T)^\perp$. So the non-trivial part of the above theorem is the opposite inclusion in the final two bullets.

== Corollaries ==
Several corollaries are immediate from the theorem. For instance, a densely defined closed operator $T$ as above has $R(T) = Y$ if and only if the transpose $T'$ has a continuous inverse. Similarly, $R(T') = X'$ if and only if $T$ has a continuous inverse.

== Sketch of proof ==
Since the graph of T is closed, the proof reduces to the case when $T : X \to Y$ is a bounded operator between Banach spaces. Now, $T$ factors as $X \overset{p}\to X/\operatorname{ker}T \overset{T_0}\to \operatorname{im}T \overset{i}\hookrightarrow Y$. Dually, $T'$ is

$$Y' \to (\operatorname{im}T)' \overset{T_0'}\to (X/\operatorname{ker}T)' \to X'.$$

Now, if $\operatorname{im}T$ is closed, then it is Banach and so by the open mapping theorem, $T_0$ is a topological isomorphism. It follows that $T_0'$ is an isomorphism and then $\operatorname{im}(T') = \operatorname{ker}(T)^{\bot}$. (More work is needed for the other implications.) $\square$
