= Van der Corput's method =

In mathematics, van der Corput's method generates estimates for exponential sums. The method applies two processes, the van der Corput processes A and B which relate the sums into simpler sums which are easier to estimate.

The processes apply to exponential sums of the form

$$\sum_{n=a}^b e(f(n)) \$$

where f is a sufficiently smooth function and e(x) denotes exp(2πix).

== Process A ==
To apply process A, write the first difference f_{h}(x) for f(x+h)−f(x), and assume there is H ≤ b−a such that

$$\sum_{h=1}^H \left\vert{ \sum_{n=a}^{b-h} e(f_h(n)) }\right\vert \le b-a \ .$$

Then

$$\left\vert{ \sum_{n=a}^b e(f(n)) }\right\vert \ll \frac{b-a}{\sqrt H} \ .$$

== Process B ==
Process B transforms the sum involving f into one involving a function g defined in terms of the derivative of f. Suppose that f' is monotone increasing with f'(a) = α, f'(b) = β. Then f' is invertible on [α,β]; let its inverse be u. Further suppose f" ≥ λ > 0. Write

$$g(y) = f(u(y)) - y u(y) \ .$$

We have

$$\left\vert{ \sum_{n=a}^b e(f(n)) }\right\vert \ll \frac{1}{\sqrt \lambda} \max_{\alpha \le \gamma \le \beta} \left\vert{ \sum_{\nu=\alpha}^\gamma e(g(\nu)) }\right\vert \ .$$

Applying Process B again to the sum involving g returns to the sum over f and so yields no further information.

== Exponent pairs ==
The method of exponent pairs gives a class of estimates for functions with a particular smoothness property. Fix parameters N,R,T,s,δ. We consider functions f defined on an interval [N,2N] which are R times continuously differentiable, satisfying

$$\left\vert{ f^{(r+1)}(x) - (-1)^r s(s+1)\cdots(s+r)T x^{-s-r} }\right\vert \le \delta s(s+1)\cdots(s+r)T x^{-s-r} \$$

uniformly on [a,b] for 0 ≤ r < R.

We say that a pair of real numbers (k,l) with 0 ≤ k ≤ 1/2 ≤ l ≤ 1 is an exponent pair if for each σ > 0 there exists δ and R depending on k,l,σ such that

$$\left\vert{ \sum_{n=a}^b e(f(n)) }\right\vert \ll \left({\frac{T}{N^\sigma}}\right)^k  N^l \$$

uniformly in f.

By Process A we find that if (k,l) is an exponent pair then so is $\left({\frac{k}{2k+2},\frac{k+l+1}{2k+2}}\right)$. By Process B we find that so is $\left({l-1/2,k+1/2}\right)$.

A trivial bound shows that (0,1) is an exponent pair.

The set of exponents pairs is convex.

It is known that if (k,l) is an exponent pair then the Riemann zeta function on the critical line satisfies

$\zeta(1/2+i t) \ll t^\theta \log t$

where $\theta = (k+l-1/2)/2$.

The exponent pair conjecture states that for all ε > 0, the pair (ε,1/2+ε) is an exponent pair. This conjecture implies the Lindelöf hypothesis.
