= Weyl–von Neumann theorem =

In mathematics, the Weyl–von Neumann theorem is a result in operator theory due to Hermann Weyl and John von Neumann. It states that, after the addition of a compact operator (Weyl (1909)) or Hilbert–Schmidt operator (von Neumann (1935)) of arbitrarily small norm, a bounded self-adjoint operator or unitary operator on a Hilbert space is conjugate by a unitary operator to a diagonal operator. The results are subsumed in later generalizations for bounded normal operators due to David Berg (1971, compact perturbation) and Dan-Virgil Voiculescu (1979, Hilbert–Schmidt perturbation). The theorem and its generalizations were one of the starting points of operator K-homology, developed first by Lawrence G. Brown, Ronald Douglas and Peter Fillmore and, in greater generality, by Gennadi Kasparov.

In 1958 Kuroda showed that the Weyl–von Neumann theorem is also true if the Hilbert–Schmidt class is replaced by any Schatten class S_{p} with p ≠ 1. For S_{1}, the trace-class operators, the situation is quite different. The Kato–Rosenblum theorem, proved in 1957 using scattering theory, states that if two bounded self-adjoint operators differ by a trace-class operator, then their absolutely continuous parts are unitarily equivalent. In particular if a self-adjoint operator has absolutely continuous spectrum, no perturbation of it by a trace-class operator can be unitarily equivalent to a diagonal operator.
