= Riesz projector =

In mathematics, or more specifically in spectral theory, the Riesz projector is the projector onto the eigenspace corresponding to a particular eigenvalue of an operator (or, more generally, a projector onto an invariant subspace corresponding to an isolated part of the spectrum). It was introduced by Frigyes Riesz in 1912.

== Definition ==
Let $A$ be a closed linear operator in the Banach space $\mathfrak{B}$. Let $\Gamma$ be a simple or composite rectifiable contour, which encloses some region $G_\Gamma$ and lies entirely within the resolvent set $\rho(A)$ ($\Gamma\subset\rho(A)$) of the operator $A$. Assuming that the contour $\Gamma$ has a positive orientation with respect to the region $G_\Gamma$, the Riesz projector corresponding to $\Gamma$ is defined by

$$P_\Gamma=-\frac{1}{2\pi \mathrm{i}}\oint_\Gamma(A-z I_{\mathfrak{B}})^{-1}\,\mathrm{d}z;$$

here $I_{\mathfrak{B}}$ is the identity operator in $\mathfrak{B}$.

If $\lambda\in\sigma(A)$ is the only point of the spectrum of $A$ in $G_\Gamma$, then $P_\Gamma$ is denoted by $P_\lambda$.

== Properties ==
The operator $P_\Gamma$ is a projector which commutes with $A$, and hence in the decomposition

$$\mathfrak{B}=\mathfrak{L}_\Gamma\oplus\mathfrak{N}_\Gamma
\qquad
\mathfrak{L}_\Gamma=P_\Gamma\mathfrak{B},
\quad
\mathfrak{N}_\Gamma=(I_{\mathfrak{B}}-P_\Gamma)\mathfrak{B},$$

both terms $\mathfrak{L}_\Gamma$ and $\mathfrak{N}_\Gamma$ are invariant subspaces of the operator $A$. Moreover,

1. The spectrum of the restriction of $A$ to the subspace $\mathfrak{L}_\Gamma$ is contained in the region $G_\Gamma$;
2. The spectrum of the restriction of $A$ to the subspace $\mathfrak{N}_\Gamma$ lies outside the closure of $G_\Gamma$.

If $\Gamma_1$ and $\Gamma_2$ are two different contours having the properties indicated above, and the regions $G_{\Gamma_1}$ and $G_{\Gamma_2}$ have no points in common, then the projectors corresponding to them are mutually orthogonal:

$$P_{\Gamma_1}P_{\Gamma_2}
=
P_{\Gamma_2}P_{\Gamma_1}=0.$$

== See also ==
- Spectrum (functional analysis)
- Decomposition of spectrum (functional analysis)
- Spectrum of an operator
- Resolvent formalism
- Operator theory
