= Weyl's inequality (number theory) =

In number theory, Weyl's inequality, named for Hermann Weyl, states that if M, N, a and q are integers, with a and q coprime, q > 0, and f is a real polynomial of degree k whose leading coefficient c satisfies

$$|c-a/q|\le tq^{-2},$$

for some t greater than or equal to 1, then for any positive real number $\scriptstyle\varepsilon$ one has

$$\sum_{x=M}^{M+N}\exp(2\pi if(x))=O\left(N^{1+\varepsilon}\left({t\over q}+{1\over N}+{t\over N^{k-1}}+{q\over N^k}\right)^{2^{1-k}}\right)\text{ as }N\to\infty.$$

This inequality will only be useful when

$$q < N^k,$$

for otherwise estimating the modulus of the exponential sum by means of the triangle inequality as $\scriptstyle\le\, N$ provides a better bound.
