= Weyl's tube formula =

Weyl's tube formula gives the volume of an object defined as the set of all points within a small distance of a manifold.

Let $\Sigma$ be an oriented, closed, two-dimensional surface, and let $N_\varepsilon(\Sigma)$ denote the set of all points within a distance $\varepsilon$ of the surface $\Sigma$. Then, for $\varepsilon$ sufficiently small, the volume of $N_\varepsilon(\Sigma)$ is

$$V = 2A(\Sigma)\varepsilon + \frac{4\pi}{3} \chi(\Sigma)\varepsilon^3,$$

where $A(\Sigma)$ is the area of the surface and $\chi(\Sigma)$ is its Euler characteristic. This expression can be generalized to the case where $\Sigma$ is a $q$-dimensional submanifold of $n$-dimensional Euclidean space $\mathbb{R}^n$.
