= Exponential sum =

Finite sum formed using the exponential function

In mathematics, an exponential sum may be a finite Fourier series (i.e. a trigonometric polynomial), or other finite sum formed using the exponential function, usually expressed by means of the function

$$e(x) = \exp(2\pi ix).\,$$

Therefore, a typical exponential sum may take the form

$$\sum_n e(x_n),$$

summed over a finite sequence of real numbers x_{n}.

== Formulation ==
If we allow some real coefficients a_{n}, to get the form

$$\sum_n a_n e(x_n)$$

it is the same as allowing exponents that are complex numbers. Both forms are certainly useful in applications. A large part of twentieth century analytic number theory was devoted to finding good estimates for these sums, a trend started by basic work of Hermann Weyl in diophantine approximation.

== Estimates ==
The main thrust of the subject is that a sum

$$S=\sum_n e(x_n)$$

is trivially estimated by the number N of terms. That is, the absolute value

$$|S| \le N\,$$

by the triangle inequality, since each summand has absolute value 1. In applications one would like to do better. That involves proving some cancellation takes place, or in other words that this sum of complex numbers on the unit circle is not of numbers all with the same argument. The best that is reasonable to hope for is an estimate of the form

$$|S|= O(\sqrt{N})\,$$

which signifies, up to the implied constant in the big O notation, that the sum resembles a random walk in two dimensions.

Such an estimate can be considered ideal; it is unattainable in many of the major problems, and estimates

$$|S|= o(N)\,$$

have to be used, where the o(N) function represents only a small saving on the trivial estimate. A typical 'small saving' may be a factor of log(N), for example. Even such a minor-seeming result in the right direction has to be referred all the way back to the structure of the initial sequence x_{n}, to show a degree of randomness. The techniques involved are ingenious and subtle.

A variant of 'Weyl differencing' investigated by Weyl involving a generating exponential sum

$G(\tau)= \sum_n e^{iaf(x)+ia\tau n}$

was previously studied by Weyl himself, he developed a method to express the sum as the value $G(0)$, where 'G' can be defined via a linear differential equation similar to Dyson equation obtained via summation by parts.

== History ==
If the sum is of the form

$$S(x)= e^{ia f(x) }$$

where ƒ is a smooth function, we could use the Euler–Maclaurin formula to convert the series into an integral, plus some corrections involving derivatives of S(x), then for large values of a you could use "stationary phase" method to calculate the integral and give an approximate evaluation of the sum. Major advances in the subject were Van der Corput's method (c. 1920), related to the principle of stationary phase, and the later Vinogradov method (c.1930).

The large sieve method (c.1960), the work of many researchers, is a relatively transparent general principle; but no one method has general application.

== Types of exponential sum ==
Many types of sums are used in formulating particular problems; applications require usually a reduction to some known type, often by ingenious manipulations. Partial summation can be used to remove coefficients a_{n}, in many cases.

A basic distinction is between a complete exponential sum, which is typically a sum over all residue classes modulo some integer N (or more general finite ring), and an incomplete exponential sum where the range of summation is restricted by some inequality. Examples of complete exponential sums are Gauss sums and Kloosterman sums; these are in some sense finite field or finite ring analogues of the gamma function and some sort of Bessel function, respectively, and have many 'structural' properties. An example of an incomplete sum is the partial sum of the quadratic Gauss sum (indeed, the case investigated by Gauss). Here there are good estimates for sums over shorter ranges than the whole set of residue classes, because, in geometric terms, the partial sums approximate a Cornu spiral; this implies massive cancellation.

Auxiliary types of sums occur in the theory, for example character sums; going back to Harold Davenport's thesis. The Weil conjectures had major applications to complete sums with domain restricted by polynomial conditions (i.e., along an algebraic variety over a finite field).

== Weyl sums ==
One of the most general types of exponential sum is the Weyl sum, with exponents 2πif(n) where f is a fairly general real-valued smooth function. These are the sums involved in the distribution of the values

ƒ(n) modulo 1,

according to Weyl's equidistribution criterion. A basic advance was Weyl's inequality for such sums, for polynomial f.

There is a general theory of exponent pairs, which formulates estimates. An important case is where f is logarithmic, in relation with the Riemann zeta function. See also equidistribution theorem.

== Example: the quadratic Gauss sum ==
Let p be an odd prime and let $\xi = e^{2\pi i / p}$. Then the Quadratic Gauss sum is given by

$$\sum_{n=0}^{p-1}\xi^{n^2} =
\begin{cases}
\sqrt{p}, & p = 1 \mod 4 \\
i\sqrt{p}, & p = 3 \mod 4
\end{cases}$$

where the square roots are taken to be positive.

This is the ideal degree of cancellation one could hope for without any a priori knowledge of the structure of the sum, since it matches the scaling of a random walk.

== Statistical model ==
The sum of exponentials is a useful model in pharmacokinetics (chemical kinetics in general) for describing the concentration of a substance over time. The exponential terms correspond to first-order reactions, which in pharmacology corresponds to the number of modelled diffusion compartments.

== See also ==
- Hua's lemma
