= Essential range =

Concept in measure theory

In mathematics, particularly measure theory, the essential range, or the set of essential values, of a function is intuitively the 'non-negligible' range of the function: It does not change between two functions that are equal almost everywhere. One way of thinking of the essential range of a function is the set on which the range of the function is 'concentrated'.

== Formal definition ==
Let $(X,{\cal A},\mu)$ be a measure space, and let $(Y,{\cal T})$ be a topological space. For any $({\cal A},\sigma({\cal T}))$-measurable function $f:X\to Y$, we say the essential range of $f$ to mean the set

$\operatorname{ess.im}(f) = \left\{y\in Y\mid0<\mu(f^{-1}(U))\text{ for all }U\in{\cal T} \text{ with } y \in U\right\}.$

Equivalently, $\operatorname{ess.im}(f)=\operatorname{supp}(f_*\mu)$, where $f_*\mu$ is the pushforward measure onto $\sigma({\cal T})$ of $\mu$ under $f$ and $\operatorname{supp}(f_*\mu)$ denotes the support of $f_*\mu.$

=== Essential values ===
The phrase "essential value of $f$" is sometimes used to mean an element of the essential range of $f.$

== Special cases of common interest ==
=== Y = C ===
Say $(Y,{\cal T})$ is $\mathbb C$ equipped with its usual topology. Then the essential range of f is given by

$\operatorname{ess.im}(f) = \left\{z \in \mathbb{C} \mid \text{for all}\ \varepsilon\in\mathbb R_{>0}: 0<\mu\{x\in X: |f(x) - z| < \varepsilon\}\right\}.$

In other words: The essential range of a complex-valued function is the set of all complex numbers z such that the inverse image of each ε-neighbourhood of z under f has positive measure.

=== (Y,T) is discrete ===
Say $(Y,{\cal T})$ is discrete, i.e., ${\cal T}={\cal P}(Y)$ is the power set of $Y,$ i.e., the discrete topology on $Y.$ Then the essential range of f is the set of values y in Y with strictly positive $f_*\mu$-measure:

$\operatorname{ess.im}(f)=\{y\in Y:0<\mu(f^\text{pre}\{y\})\}=\{y\in Y:0<(f_*\mu)\{y\}\}.$

== Properties ==
- The essential range of a measurable function, being the support of a measure, is always closed.
- The essential range ess.im(f) of a measurable function is always a subset of $\overline{\operatorname{im}(f)}$.
- The essential image cannot be used to distinguish functions that are almost everywhere equal: If $f=g$ holds $\mu$-almost everywhere, then $\operatorname{ess.im}(f)=\operatorname{ess.im}(g)$.
- These two facts characterise the essential image: It is the biggest set contained in the closures of $\operatorname{im}(g)$ for all g that are a.e. equal to f:

$$\operatorname{ess.im}(f) = \bigcap_{f=g\,\text{a.e.}} \overline{\operatorname{im}(g)}$$.

- The essential range satisfies $\forall A\subseteq X: f(A) \cap \operatorname{ess.im}(f) = \emptyset \implies \mu(A) = 0$.
- This fact characterises the essential image: It is the smallest closed subset of $\mathbb{C}$ with this property.
- The essential supremum of a real valued function equals the supremum of its essential image and the essential infimum equals the infimum of its essential range. Consequently, a function is essentially bounded if and only if its essential range is bounded.
- The essential range of an essentially bounded function f is equal to the spectrum $\sigma(f)$ where f is considered as an element of the C*-algebra $L^\infty(\mu)$.

== Examples ==
- If $\mu$ is the zero measure, then the essential image of all measurable functions is empty.
- This also illustrates that even though the essential range of a function is a subset of the closure of the range of that function, equality of the two sets need not hold.
- If $X\subseteq\mathbb{R}^n$ is open, $f:X\to\mathbb{C}$ continuous and $\mu$ the Lebesgue measure, then $\operatorname{ess.im}(f)=\overline{\operatorname{im}(f)}$ holds. This holds more generally for all Borel measures that assign non-zero measure to every non-empty open set.

== Extension ==
The notion of essential range can be extended to the case of $f : X \to Y$, where $Y$ is a separable metric space. If $X$ and $Y$ are differentiable manifolds of the same dimension, if $f\in$ VMO$(X, Y)$ and if $\operatorname{ess.im} (f) \ne Y$, then $\deg f = 0$.

== See also ==
- Essential supremum and essential infimum
- measure
- L^{p} space
