= Densely defined operator =

Linear operator on dense subset of its apparent domain

In mathematics – specifically, in operator theory – a densely defined operator or partially defined operator is a type of partially defined function. In a topological sense, it is a linear operator that is defined "almost everywhere". Densely defined operators often arise in functional analysis as operations that one would like to apply to a larger class of objects than those for which they a priori "make sense".

A closed operator that is used in practice is often densely defined.

== Definition ==
Let $X,Y$ be topological vector spaces.

A densely defined linear operator $T$ from $X$ to $Y$ is a linear operator of type $T: D(T) \to Y$, such that $D(T)$ is a dense subset of $X$. In other words, $T$ is a partial function whose domain is dense in $X$.

Sometimes this is abbreviated as $T : X \to Y$ when the context makes it clear that $T$ might not be defined for all of $X$.

== Properties ==
Closed Graph Theorem—If $X, Y$ are Hausdorff and metrizable, $T : D(T) \to Y$ is densely defined, with continuous inverse $S : Y \to D(T)$, then $T$ is closed. That is, the set $\{(x, T(x)): x \in D(T)\}$ is closed in the product topology of $X \times Y$.

Proof

Take any net $(x_\alpha)$ in $D(T)$ with $T x_\alpha\to y$ in $Y$. By continuity of $S$, $x_\alpha = S(Tx_\alpha)\to\ S(y)$. Hence there exists some $x \in D(T)$ such that $x_\alpha\to x$, and $T x = T(S(y)) = y$.

The Hausdorff property ensures sequential convergence is unique. The metrizability property ensures that sequentially closed sets are closed. In functional analysis, these conditions typically hold, as most spaces under consideration are Fréchet space, or stronger than Fréchet. In particular, Banach spaces are Fréchet.

== Examples ==
=== Sequence ===
Let $X=\ell^{2}(\mathbb N)$ be the Hilbert space of square-summable sequences, with orthonormal basis $(e_n)_{n\ge 1}$. Define the diagonal operator

$$A : D(A)\to \ell^{2}, \qquad x_n \mapsto nx_n,$$

with domain

$$D(A):=\Big\{x=(x_n)_{n\ge 1}\in \ell^{2}:\sum_{n=1}^{\infty} n^{2} | x_n|^{2}<\infty\Big\}.$$

Then $D(A)$ is dense in $\ell^2$ because the finitely supported sequences $c_{00}\subset D(A)$, and $c_{00}$ is dense in $\ell^2$. The operator $A$ is closed and unbounded, since $\|Ae_n\|_2=n$.

There exists a bounded inverse:

$$A^{-1}:\ell^{2}\to D(A),\qquad (A^{-1}y)_n:=\frac{y_n}{n},\qquad \|A^{-1}\|=\sup_{n\ge 1}\frac{1}{n}=1.$$

Hence $A:D(A)\to \ell^{2}$ is bijective with bounded inverse, so $0\in\rho(A)$ and, by the Neumann series argument, the resolvent set of $A$ contains the open unit disk $\{\,\lambda\in\mathbb C:\ |\lambda|<1\,\}$.

In fact, the spectrum of $A$ (that is, the complement of its resolvent set) is precisely the set of positive integers, since for any $\lambda \not\in \{1, 2, \dots\}$, the diagonal formula

$$(A-\lambda I)^{-1}y=\bigl(\tfrac{y_n}{n-\lambda}\bigr)_{n\ge 1}$$

defines a bounded operator $\ell^2\to D(A)$.

Thus, $A$ is a densely defined, closed, unbounded operator with bounded inverse and nontrivial, unbounded spectrum.

=== Differentiation ===
Consider the space $C^0([0, 1]; \R)$ of all real-valued, continuous functions defined on the unit interval; let $C^1([0, 1]; \R)$ denote the subspace consisting of all continuously differentiable functions. Equip $C^0([0, 1]; \R)$ with the supremum norm $\|\,\cdot\,\|_\infty$; this makes $C^0([0, 1]; \R)$ into a real Banach space. The differentiation operator $D$ given by
$$(\mathrm{D} u)(x) = u'(x)$$
is a linear operator defined on the dense linear subspace $C^1([0, 1]; \R) \subset C^0([0, 1]; \R)$, therefore it is a operator densely defined on $C^0([0, 1]; \R)$.

The operator $\mathrm{D}$ is an example of an unbounded linear operator, since
$$u_n (x) = e^{- n x} \quad \text{ has } \quad \frac{\left\|\mathrm{D} u_n\right\|_{\infty}}{\left\|u_n\right\|_\infty} = n.$$
This unboundedness causes problems if one wishes to somehow continuously extend the differentiation operator $D$ to the whole of $C^0([0, 1]; \R).$

=== Paley–Wiener ===
The Paley–Wiener integral is a standard example of a continuous extension of a densely defined operator.

In any abstract Wiener space $i : H \to E$ with adjoint $j := i^* : E^* \to H,$ there is a natural continuous linear operator (in fact it is the inclusion, and is an isometry) from $j\left(E^*\right)$ to $L^2(E, \gamma; \R),$ under which $j(f) \in j\left(E^*\right) \subseteq H$ goes to the equivalence class $[f]$ of $f$ in $L^2(E, \gamma; \R).$ It can be shown that $j\left(E^*\right)$ is dense in $H.$ Since the above inclusion is continuous, there is a unique continuous linear extension $I : H \to L^2(E, \gamma; \R)$ of the inclusion $j\left(E^*\right) \to L^2(E, \gamma; \R)$ to the whole of $H.$ This extension is the Paley–Wiener map.

== See also ==
- Blumberg theorem – Any real function on R admits a continuous restriction on a dense subset of R
- Closed graph theorem (functional analysis) – Theorems connecting continuity to closure of graphs
- Linear extension (linear algebra) – Mathematical function, in linear algebra
- Partial function – Function whose actual domain of definition may be smaller than its apparent domain
