= Resolvent set =

Linear operator in algebra and operator theory

In linear algebra and operator theory, the resolvent set of a linear operator is a set of complex numbers for which the operator is in some sense "well-behaved". The resolvent set plays an important role in the resolvent formalism.

== Definitions ==
Let X be a Banach space and let $L\colon D(L)\rightarrow X$ be a linear operator with domain $D(L) \subseteq X$. Let id denote the identity operator on X. For any $\lambda \in \mathbb{C}$, let

$$L_{\lambda} = L - \lambda\,\mathrm{id}.$$

A complex number $\lambda$ is said to be a regular value if the following three statements are true:

1. $L_\lambda$ is injective, that is, the corestriction of $L_\lambda$ to its image has an inverse $R(\lambda, L)=(L-\lambda \,\mathrm{id})^{-1}$ called the resolvent;
2. $R(\lambda,L)$ is a bounded linear operator;
3. $R(\lambda,L)$ is defined on a dense subspace of X, that is, $L_\lambda$ has dense range.

The resolvent set of L is the set of all regular values of L:

$$\rho(L) = \{ \lambda \in \mathbb{C} \mid \lambda \mbox{ is a regular value of } L \}.$$

The spectrum is the complement of the resolvent set

$$\sigma (L) = \mathbb{C} \setminus \rho (L),$$

and subject to a mutually singular spectral decomposition into the point spectrum (when condition 1 fails), the continuous spectrum (when condition 2 fails) and the residual spectrum (when condition 3 fails).

If $L$ is a closed operator, then so is each $L_\lambda$, and condition 3 may be replaced by requiring that $L_\lambda$ be surjective.

== Properties ==
- The resolvent set $\rho(L) \subseteq \mathbb{C}$ of a bounded linear operator L is an open set.
- More generally, the resolvent set of a densely defined closed unbounded operator is an open set.

== See also ==
- Resolvent formalism
- Spectrum (functional analysis)
- Decomposition of spectrum (functional analysis)
