= Unbounded operator =

Linear operator defined on a dense linear subspace

In mathematics, more specifically functional analysis and operator theory, the notion of unbounded operator provides an abstract framework for dealing with differential operators, unbounded observables in quantum mechanics, and other cases.

The term "unbounded operator" can be misleading, since

- "unbounded" should sometimes be understood as "not necessarily bounded";
- "operator" should be understood as "linear operator" (as in the case of "bounded operator");
- the domain of the operator is a linear subspace, not necessarily the whole space;
- this linear subspace is not necessarily closed; often (but not always) it is assumed to be dense;
- in the special case of a bounded operator, still, the domain is usually assumed to be the whole space.

In contrast to bounded operators, unbounded operators on a given space do not form an algebra, nor even a linear space, because each one is defined on its own domain.

The term "operator" often means "bounded linear operator", but in the context of this article it means "unbounded operator", with the reservations made above.

== Short history ==
The theory of unbounded operators developed in the late 1920s and early 1930s as part of developing a rigorous mathematical framework for quantum mechanics. The theory's development is due to John von Neumann and Marshall Stone. Von Neumann introduced using graphs to analyze unbounded operators in 1932.

== Definitions and basic properties ==
Let X, Y be Banach spaces. An unbounded operator (or simply operator) T : D(T) → Y is a linear map T from a linear subspace D(T) ⊆ X—the domain of T—to the space Y. Contrary to the usual convention, T may not be defined on the whole space X.

The graph Γ(T) of an operator $T$ from $X$ to $Y$ is a linear subspace of the direct sum X ⊕ Y, defined as the set of all pairs (x, Tx), where x runs over the domain of T . An operator T is said to be closed if its graph Γ(T) is a closed set. Explicitly, this means that for every sequence {x_{n}} of points from the domain of T such that x_{n} → x and Tx_{n} → y, it holds that x belongs to the domain of T and Tx = y. The closedness can also be formulated in terms of the graph norm: an operator T is closed if and only if its domain D(T) is a complete space with respect to the norm:

$$\|x\|_T = \sqrt{ \|x\|^2 + \|Tx\|^2 }.$$

An operator T is said to be densely defined if its domain is dense in X. This also includes operators defined on the entire space X, since the whole space is dense in itself. The denseness of the domain is necessary and sufficient for the existence of the adjoint (if X and Y are Hilbert spaces) and the transpose; see the sections below.

If T : D(T) → Y is closed, densely defined and continuous on its domain, then its domain is all of X. (Note: Suppose f_{j} is a sequence in the domain of T that converges to g ∈ X. Since T is uniformly continuous on its domain, Tf_{j} is Cauchy in Y. Thus, ( f_{j} , T f_{j} ) is Cauchy and so converges to some ( f , T f ) since the graph of T is closed. Hence, f = g, and the domain of T is closed.)

== Example ==
Let C([0, 1]) denote the space of continuous functions on the unit interval, and let C^{1}([0, 1]) denote the space of continuously differentiable functions on the unit interval. We equip $C([0,1])$ with the supremum norm, $\|\cdot\|_{\infty}$, making it a Banach space. Define the classical differentiation operator d/dx : C^{1}([0, 1]) → C([0, 1]) by the usual formula:

$$\left (\frac{d}{dx}f \right )(x) = \lim_{h \to 0} \frac{f(x+h) - f(x)}{h}, \qquad \forall x \in [0, 1].$$

Every differentiable function is continuous, so C^{1}([0, 1]) ⊆ C([0, 1]). We claim that d/dx : C([0, 1]) → C([0, 1]) is a well-defined unbounded operator, with domain C^{1}([0, 1]). For this, we need to show that $\frac{d}{dx}$ is linear and then, for example, exhibit some $\{f_n\}_n \subset C^1([0,1])$ such that $\|f_n\|_\infty=1$ and $\sup_n \|\frac{d}{dx} f_n\|_\infty=+\infty$.

This is a linear operator, since a linear combination a f + bg of two continuously differentiable functions f , g is also continuously differentiable, and

$$\left (\tfrac{d}{dx} \right )(af+bg)= a \left (\tfrac{d}{dx}  f \right ) + b \left (\tfrac{d}{dx} g \right ).$$

The operator is not bounded. For example,

$$\begin{cases} f_n : [0, 1] \to [-1, 1] \\ f_n(x) = \sin (2\pi n x) \end{cases}$$

satisfy

$$\left \|f_n \right \|_{\infty} = 1,$$

but

$$\left \| \left (\tfrac{d}{dx}  f_n \right ) \right \|_{\infty} = 2\pi n \to \infty$$

as $n\to\infty$.

The operator is densely defined (which can be shown by the Weierstrass approximation theorem, since the set of polynomial functions on [0,1] is contained in C^{1}([0, 1]), while also being dense in C([0, 1])) and closed.

The same operator can be treated as an operator Z → Z for many choices of Banach space Z and not be bounded between any of them. At the same time, it can be bounded as an operator X → Y for other pairs of Banach spaces X, Y, and also as operator Z → Z for some topological vector spaces Z. As an example let I ⊂ R be an open interval and consider

$$\frac{d}{dx} : \left (C^1 (I), \|\cdot \|_{C^1} \right ) \to \left ( C (I), \| \cdot \|_{\infty} \right),$$

where:

$$\| f \|_{C^1} = \| f \|_{\infty} + \| f' \|_{\infty}.$$

== Adjoint ==
The adjoint of an unbounded operator can be defined in two equivalent ways. Let $T : D(T) \subseteq H_1 \to H_2$ be an unbounded operator between Hilbert spaces.

First, it can be defined in a way analogous to how one defines the adjoint of a bounded operator. Namely, the adjoint $T^* : D\left(T^*\right) \subseteq H_2 \to H_1$ of T is defined as an operator with the property:
$$\langle Tx \mid y \rangle_2 = \left \langle x \mid T^*y \right \rangle_1, \qquad x \in D(T).$$
More precisely, $T^* y$ is defined in the following way. If $y \in H_2$ is such that $x \mapsto \langle Tx \mid y \rangle$ is a continuous linear functional on the domain of T, then $y$ is declared to be an element of $D\left(T^*\right),$ and after extending the linear functional to the whole space via the Hahn–Banach theorem, it is possible to find some $z$ in $H_1$ such that
$$\langle Tx \mid y \rangle_2 = \langle x \mid z \rangle_1, \qquad x \in D(T),$$
since Riesz representation theorem allows the continuous dual of the Hilbert space $H_1$ to be identified with the set of linear functionals given by the inner product. This vector $z$ is uniquely determined by $y$ if and only if the linear functional $x \mapsto \langle Tx \mid y \rangle$ is densely defined; or equivalently, if T is densely defined. Finally, letting $T^* y = z$ completes the construction of $T^*,$ which is necessarily a linear map. The adjoint $T^* y$ exists if and only if T is densely defined.

By definition, the domain of $T^*$ consists of elements $y$ in $H_2$ such that $x \mapsto \langle Tx \mid y \rangle$ is continuous on the domain of T. Consequently, the domain of $T^*$ could be anything; it could be trivial (that is, contains only zero). It may happen that the domain of $T^*$ is a closed hyperplane and $T^*$ vanishes everywhere on the domain. Thus, boundedness of $T^*$ on its domain does not imply boundedness of T. On the other hand, if $T^*$ is defined on the whole space then T is bounded on its domain and therefore can be extended by continuity to a bounded operator on the whole space. (Note: Proof: being closed, the everywhere defined $T^*$ is bounded, which implies boundedness of $T^{**},$ the latter being the closure of T. See also (Pedersen 1989, 2.3.11) for the case of everywhere defined T.) If the domain of $T^*$ is dense, then it has its adjoint $T^{**}.$ A closed densely defined operator T is bounded if and only if $T^*$ is bounded. (Note: Proof: $T^{**} = T.$ So if $T^*$ is bounded then its adjoint T is bounded.)

The other equivalent definition of the adjoint can be obtained by noticing a general fact. Define a linear operator $J$ as follows:
$$\begin{cases} J: H_1 \oplus H_2 \to H_2 \oplus H_1 \\ J(x \oplus y) = -y \oplus x \end{cases}$$
Since $J$ is an isometric surjection, it is unitary. Hence: $J(\Gamma(T))^{\bot}$ is the graph of some operator $S$ if and only if T is densely defined. A simple calculation shows that this "some" $S$ satisfies:
$$\langle Tx \mid y \rangle_2 = \langle x \mid Sy \rangle_1,$$
for every x in the domain of T. Thus $S$ is the adjoint of T.

It follows immediately from the above definition that the adjoint $T^*$ is closed. In particular, a self-adjoint operator (meaning $T = T^*$) is closed. An operator T is closed and densely defined if and only if $T^{**} = T.$ (Note: Proof: If T is closed densely defined then $T^*$ exists and is densely defined. Thus $T^{**}$ exists. The graph of T is dense in the graph of $T^{**};$ hence $T = T^{**}.$ Conversely, since the existence of $T^{**}$ implies that that of $T^*,$ which in turn implies T is densely defined. Since $T^{**}$ is closed, T is densely defined and closed.)

Some well-known properties for bounded operators generalize to closed densely defined operators. The kernel of a closed operator is closed. Moreover, the kernel of a closed densely defined operator $T : H_1 \to H_2$ coincides with the orthogonal complement of the range of the adjoint. That is,
$$\operatorname{ker}(T) = \operatorname{ran}(T^*)^\bot.$$
von Neumann's theorem states that $T^* T$ and $T T^*$ are self-adjoint, and that $I + T^* T$ and $I + T T^*$ both have bounded inverses. If $T^*$ has trivial kernel, T has dense range (by the above identity.) Moreover:

T is surjective if and only if there is a $K > 0$ such that $\|f\|_2 \leq K \left\|T^* f\right\|_1$ for all $f$ in $D\left(T^*\right).$ (Note: If $T$ is surjective then $T : (\ker T)^{\bot} \to H_2$ has bounded inverse, denoted by $S.$ The estimate then follows since $$\|f\|_2^2 = \left |\langle TSf \mid f \rangle_2 \right | \leq \|S\| \|f\|_2 \left \|T^*f \right \|_1$$ Conversely, suppose the estimate holds. Since $T^*$ has closed range, it is the case that $\operatorname{ran}(T) = \operatorname{ran}\left(T T^*\right).$ Since $\operatorname{ran}(T)$ is dense, it suffices to show that $T T^*$ has closed range. If $T T^* f_j$ is convergent then $f_j$ is convergent by the estimate since $$\|T^*f_j\|_1^2 = | \langle T^*f_j \mid T^*f_j \rangle_1| \leq \|TT^*f_j\|_2 \|f_j\|_2.$$ Say, $f_j \to g.$ Since $T T^*$ is self-adjoint; thus, closed, (von Neumann's theorem), $T T^* f_j \to T T^* g.$ QED) (This is essentially a variant of the so-called closed range theorem.) In particular, T has closed range if and only if $T^*$ has closed range.

In contrast to the bounded case, it is not necessary that $(T S)^* = S^* T^*,$ since, for example, it is even possible that $(T S)^*$ does not exist. This is, however, the case if, for example, T is bounded.

A densely defined, closed operator T is called normal if it satisfies the following equivalent conditions:

- $T^* T = T T^*$;
- the domain of T is equal to the domain of $T^*,$ and $\|T x\| = \left\|T^* x\right\|$ for every x in this domain;
- there exist self-adjoint operators $A, B$ such that $T = A + i B,$$T^* = A - i B,$ and $\|T x\|^2 = \|A x\|^2 + \|B x\|^2$ for every x in the domain of T.

Every self-adjoint operator is normal.

== Transpose ==
Let $T : B_1 \to B_2$ be an operator between Banach spaces. Then the transpose (or dual) ${}^t T: {B_2}^* \to {B_1}^*$ of $T$ is the linear operator satisfying:
$$\langle T x, y' \rangle = \langle x, \left({}^t T\right) y' \rangle$$
for all $x \in B_1$ and $y \in B_2^*.$ Here, we used the notation: $\langle x, x' \rangle = x'(x).$

The necessary and sufficient condition for the transpose of $T$ to exist is that $T$ is densely defined (for essentially the same reason as to adjoints, as discussed above.)

For any Hilbert space $H,$ there is the anti-linear isomorphism:
$$J: H^* \to H$$
given by $J f = y$ where $f(x) = \langle x \mid y \rangle_H, (x \in H).$ Through this isomorphism, the transpose ${}^t T$ relates to the adjoint $T^*$ in the following way:
$$T^* = J_1 \left({}^t T\right) J_2^{-1},$$
where $J_j: H_j^* \to H_j$. (For the finite-dimensional case, this corresponds to the fact that the adjoint of a matrix is its conjugate transpose.) Note that this gives the definition of adjoint in terms of a transpose.

== Closed linear operators ==
Closed linear operators are a class of linear operators on Banach spaces. They are more general than bounded operators, and therefore not necessarily continuous, but they still retain nice enough properties that one can define the spectrum and (with certain assumptions) functional calculus for such operators. Many important linear operators which fail to be bounded turn out to be closed, such as the derivative and a large class of differential operators.

Let X, Y be two Banach spaces. A linear operator A : D(A) ⊆ X → Y is closed if for every sequence {x_{n}} in D(A) converging to x in X such that Ax_{n} → y ∈ Y as n → ∞ one has x ∈ D(A) and Ax = y. Equivalently, A is closed if its graph is closed in the direct sum X ⊕ Y.

Given a linear operator A, not necessarily closed, if the closure of its graph in X ⊕ Y happens to be the graph of some operator, that operator is called the closure of A, and we say that A is closable. Denote the closure of A by A̅. It follows that A is the restriction of A̅ to D(A).

A core (or essential domain) of a closable operator is a subset C of D(A) such that the closure of the restriction of A to C is A̅.

=== Example ===
Consider the derivative operator A = d/dx where X = Y = C([a, b]) is the Banach space of all continuous functions on an interval [a, b]. If one takes its domain D(A) to be C^{1}([a, b]), then A is a closed operator which is not bounded. On the other hand if D(A) = C^{∞}([a, b]), then A will no longer be closed, but it will be closable, with the closure being its extension defined on C^{1}([a, b]).

== Symmetric operators and self-adjoint operators ==
An operator T on a Hilbert space is symmetric if and only if for each x and y in the domain of T we have $\langle Tx \mid y \rangle = \lang x \mid Ty \rang$. A densely defined operator T is symmetric if and only if it agrees with its adjoint T^{∗} restricted to the domain of T, in other words when T^{∗} is an extension of T.

In general, if T is densely defined and symmetric, the domain of the adjoint T^{∗} need not equal the domain of T. If T is symmetric and the domain of T and the domain of the adjoint coincide, then we say that T is self-adjoint. Note that, when T is self-adjoint, the existence of the adjoint implies that T is densely defined and since T^{∗} is necessarily closed, T is closed.

A densely defined operator T is symmetric, if the subspace Γ(T) (defined in a previous section) is orthogonal to its image J(Γ(T)) under J (where J(x,y):=(y,-x)). (Note: Follows from (Pedersen 1989, 5.1.5) and the definition via adjoint operators.)

Equivalently, an operator T is self-adjoint if it is densely defined, closed, symmetric, and satisfies the fourth condition: both operators T – i, T + i are surjective, that is, map the domain of T onto the whole space H. In other words: for every x in H there exist y and z in the domain of T such that Ty – iy = x and Tz + iz = x.

An operator T is self-adjoint, if the two subspaces Γ(T), J(Γ(T)) are orthogonal and their sum is the whole space $H \oplus H .$

This approach does not cover non-densely defined closed operators. Non-densely defined symmetric operators can be defined directly or via graphs, but not via adjoint operators.

A symmetric operator is often studied via its Cayley transform.

An operator T on a complex Hilbert space is symmetric if and only if the number $\langle Tx \mid x \rangle$ is real for all x in the domain of T.

A densely defined closed symmetric operator T is self-adjoint if and only if T^{∗} is symmetric. It may happen that it is not.

A densely defined operator T is called positive (or nonnegative) if its quadratic form is nonnegative, that is, $\langle Tx \mid x \rangle \ge 0$ for all x in the domain of T. Such operator is necessarily symmetric.

The operator T^{∗}T is self-adjoint and positive for every densely defined, closed T.

A densely defined symmetric operator T on a Hilbert space H is called bounded from below if T + a is a positive operator for some real number a. That is, ⟨Tx|x⟩ ≥ −a ||x||^{2} for all x in the domain of T (or alternatively ⟨Tx|x⟩ ≥ a ||x||^{2} since a is arbitrary). If both T and −T are bounded from below then T is bounded.

The spectral theorem applies to self-adjoint operators and moreover, to normal operators, but not to densely defined, closed operators in general, since in this case the spectrum can be empty.

A symmetric operator defined everywhere is closed, therefore bounded, which is the Hellinger–Toeplitz theorem.

== Extension-related ==
By definition, an operator T is an extension of an operator S if Γ(S) ⊆ Γ(T). An equivalent direct definition: for every x in the domain of S, x belongs to the domain of T and Sx = Tx.

Note that an everywhere defined extension exists for every operator, which is a purely algebraic fact explained at Discontinuous linear map § General existence theorem and based on the axiom of choice. If the given operator is not bounded then the extension is a discontinuous linear map. It is of little use since it cannot preserve important properties of the given operator (see below), and usually is highly non-unique.

An operator T is called closable if it satisfies the following equivalent conditions:

- T has a closed extension;
- the closure of the graph of T is the graph of some operator;
- for every sequence (x_{n}) of points from the domain of T such that x_{n} → 0 and also Tx_{n} → y it holds that y = 0.

Not all operators are closable.

A closable operator T has the least closed extension $\overline T$ called the closure of T. The closure of the graph of T is equal to the graph of $\overline T.$ Other, non-minimal closed extensions may exist.

A densely defined operator T is closable if and only if T^{∗} is densely defined. In this case $\overline T = T^{**}$ and $(\overline T)^* = T^*.$

If S is densely defined and T is an extension of S then S^{∗} is an extension of T^{∗}.

Every symmetric operator is closable.

A symmetric operator is called maximal symmetric if it has no symmetric extensions, except for itself. Every self-adjoint operator is maximal symmetric. The converse is false.

An operator is called essentially self-adjoint if its closure is self-adjoint. An operator is essentially self-adjoint if and only if it has one and only one self-adjoint extension.

A symmetric operator may have more than one self-adjoint extension, and even a continuum of them.

A densely defined, symmetric operator T is essentially self-adjoint if and only if both operators T – i, T + i have dense range.

Let T be a densely defined operator. Denoting the relation "T is an extension of S" by S ⊂ T (a conventional abbreviation for Γ(S) ⊆ Γ(T)) one has the following.

- If T is symmetric then T ⊂ T^{∗∗} ⊂ T^{∗}.
- If T is closed and symmetric then T = T^{∗∗} ⊂ T^{∗}.
- If T is self-adjoint then T = T^{∗∗} = T^{∗}.
- If T is essentially self-adjoint then T ⊂ T^{∗∗} = T^{∗}.

== Importance of self-adjoint operators ==
The class of self-adjoint operators is especially important in mathematical physics. Every self-adjoint operator is densely defined, closed and symmetric. The converse holds for bounded operators but fails in general. Self-adjointness is substantially more restricting than these three properties. The famous spectral theorem holds for self-adjoint operators. In combination with Stone's theorem on one-parameter unitary groups it shows that self-adjoint operators are precisely the infinitesimal generators of strongly continuous one-parameter unitary groups. Such unitary groups are especially important for describing time evolution in classical and quantum mechanics.

== See also ==
- Hilbert space § Unbounded operators
- Stone–von Neumann theorem
- Bounded operator
