= Fredholm =

Fredholm is a Swedish surname. Notable people with the surname include:

- Erik Ivar Fredholm (1866–1927), Swedish mathematician
  - Fredholm alternative, in mathematics
  - Fredholm determinant, in mathematics
  - Fredholm integral equation, in mathematics
  - Fredholm kernel, in mathematics
  - Fredholm module, In noncommutative geometry
  - Fredholm number, in number theory, apparently not in fact studied by Fredholm
  - Fredholm operator, in mathematics
  - Fredholm's theorem, in mathematics
  - Analytic Fredholm theorem, in mathematics
  - Fredholm theory, in mathematics
  - Fredholm (crater), a small lunar impact crater
  - 21659 Fredholm (1999 PR3), main-belt asteroid discovered in 1999 by P. G. Comba
- Ludwig Fredholm (1830–1891), Swedish industrialist
- Gert Fredholm (born 1941), Danish film director and screenwriter
- Patrik Fredholm (born 1978), Swedish footballer
