= Analytic Fredholm theorem =

In mathematics, the analytic Fredholm theorem is a result concerning the existence of bounded inverses for a family of bounded linear operators on a Hilbert space. It is the basis of two classical and important theorems, the Fredholm alternative and the Hilbert–Schmidt theorem. The result is named after the Swedish mathematician Erik Ivar Fredholm.

== Statement of the theorem ==
Let G ⊆ C be a domain (an open and connected set). Let (H, ⟨ , ⟩) be a real or complex Hilbert space and let Lin(H) denote the space of bounded linear operators from H into itself; let I denote the identity operator. Let B : G → Lin(H) be a mapping such that

- B is analytic on G in the sense that the limit $\lim_{\lambda \to \lambda_{0}} \frac{B(\lambda) - B(\lambda_{0})}{\lambda - \lambda_{0}}$ exists for all λ_{0} ∈ G; and
- the operator B(λ) is a compact operator for each λ ∈ G.

Then either

- (I − B(λ))^{−1} does not exist for any λ ∈ G; or
- (I − B(λ))^{−1} exists for every λ ∈ G \ S, where S is a discrete subset of G (i.e., S has no limit points in G). In this case, the function taking λ to (I − B(λ))^{−1} is analytic on G \ S and, if λ ∈ S, then the equation $B(\lambda) \psi = \psi$ has a finite-dimensional family of solutions.
