= Gerard Murphy (mathematician) =

Irish mathematician (1948–2006)

Gerard J. Murphy (November 1948 – 12 October 2006) MRIA was a prolific Irish mathematician. His textbooks are internationally acclaimed, and translated into different languages. He died from cancer in October 2006, at the age of 57.

== Research ==
Gerard's research was in functional analysis. In recent times his research was on quantum groups and non-commutative geometry, subjects of importance both for mathematics and physics. He authored more than 70 original mathematical papers, singly or with colleagues in Ireland, Europe and North America. He will also be remembered for his book, C*-algebras and Operator Theory, which was published in 1990 to worldwide acclaim.

Gerard's principal interests were in the general theory of C*-algebras, the spectral and index theory of Toeplitz operators on Hardy spaces of ordered groups and bounded symmetric domains, and the C*-algebra approach to quantum groups.

== Groups ==
Royal Irish Academy: He was a member of the Publications Committee of the Royal Irish Academy and Editor-in-Chief of the Mathematical Proceedings of the Royal Irish Academy. This is a journal devoted to current research in all areas of pure mathematics and appears twice yearly.

European Union Research Network: He was the Irish coordinator of the European Union Operator Algebras Network. This comprises a group of universities across seven countries in Europe that co-operate to promote research in operator algebras and noncommutative geometry.

== Quotes ==
"Gerard Murphy, like Pythagoras and Boole before him, discovered new mathematical truths, truths that will last forever. Generations of future students and researchers will build on and develop these results." Associate Professor Des MacHale, University College Cork

"Throughout his life, he took his teaching responsibility seriously, and designed his courses to further the student's understanding and appreciation of Mathematics, not only as a tool for understanding other disciplines, but also as one of mankind's greatest scientific and cultural achievements, with a history stretching back to antiquity. He strove to preserve academic standards, constantly resisting the modern tendency to lower them, and always sought to inculcate the notions of precision and proof handed down by the ancient Greeks." Professor Finbarr Holland, University College Cork

== Biography ==
Gerard was born to parents May and Larry Murphy in Drimnagh, Dublin. He came from a large family of 3 boys and 5 girls: John, Derek, Rita, Linda, Joan, Carol and Lauren. Gerard left school at 14 and worked in a variety of menial jobs, but all the while continued to educate himself at home with quiet determination.

Gerard worked his way into Trinity College Dublin on the strength of his performance on a correspondence course. In 1970 he was admitted to Trinity College and read for a degree in pure mathematics. His brilliant undergraduate career in Trinity College meant that he was awarded a Foundation Scholarship to support his studies. In 1974 he graduated with a First Class Honours BA, and he won the Berkeley Gold Medal. His success at Trinity marked him out as something special, and he was soon after awarded the Gulbenkian Scholarship to enable him to study for a PhD in the University of Cambridge. He acquired this in 1977 and won the Knight Prize for the quality of his research.

He returned to Trinity College in 1977 and took up a postdoctoral research fellowship, funded by the Department of Education and he commenced his career as a university lecturer. He then spent four years in North America in Dalhousie University, University of New Hampshire and University of Oregon. He was appointed as a lecturer in University College Cork, where he remained for the rest of his life. He was promoted twice in the minimum time period, to associate professor, in recognition of the quality and quantity of his research, the calibre of his teaching and overall contributions to the management of the college.

On foot of his expertise he was invited in the mid-1990s to participate in the EU Operator Algebras Network, and as a result of his involvement he succeeded in attracting substantial funding from the EU which enabled him to organise the first of a series of major conferences on Operators Algebras in UCC in 1995, which attracted mathematicians from all parts of the world, and to fund several postdoctoral research assistants to work under his direction. His membership of this network allowed him to establish an internationally recognised centre of excellence in UCC in operator algebras and non-commutative geometry, a legacy that will endure.

He was promoted to head of the Mathematics Department, University College Cork, when Professor P.D. Barry retired in 1999. He spent 5 years in this position. Gerard was proud of his membership of the Royal Irish Academy and as Joint Editor-in-Chief of its Mathematical Proceedings, which he helped to modernise and produce in electronic form; he raised its profile as an international journal and expanded its readership.

In 2005 he was diagnosed with cancer of the colon and liver. He died peacefully at 57 and is survived by his wife Mary, one son and three daughters, his mother and siblings.

== Remembrance ==
Professor Richard Timoney of Trinity College Dublin, in his contribution to the book Trevor West: The Bold Collegian about the multi-talented Trevor West, wrote the following remembrance of Gerard: Among the students he (Trevor) had, some were deserving of his particular interest ever after. One of those was Gerard Murphy (1948–2006) who was not a Ph.D. student of Trevor's but had a close relationship with him. Gerard came from a working-class background in Dublin and missed out on a normal secondary education, but came to the notice of the School of Mathematics in Trinity. Trevor took a special interest in him, and was pleased that Gerard turned out as a very good undergraduate in Mathematics. Gerard did his doctorate at Cambridge, not with Trevor's supervisor Smithies but with one of Smithies' mathematical descendants, finishing in 1977. Then he got a postdoctoral fellowship back at Trinity, where he worked productively with Trevor. Following three years at TCD, Gerard held some positions in North America before being appointed in Cork, where he was again within close reach of Trevor from the West family home in Midleton. Trevor encouraged Gerard to organise international research meetings in Cork, of which there were quite a few, and Trevor was always in the thick of them.

Among the several joint papers between Murphy and West, Finbarr Holland picks out a spectral radius formula for special mention in an obituary of Gerard that appeared in the Bulletin of the Irish Mathematical Society (no. 59, 2007). It is a particularly elegant formula for the spectral radius of an element in a C*-algebra that was published in a paper in the Proceedings of the Edinburgh Mathematical Society in 1979. Gerard was elected to membership of the RIA and became editor of the Mathematical Proceedings, both of which events were surely engineered by Trevor. As with many things, Trevor would not miss opportunities to plug his favourites and the considerable merits of Gerard were easy to extol, but of course Gerard's terminal illness was a blow. Maybe the most notable joint effort between them was Trevor's second mathematical monograph, often referred to as 'the little red book', which was a joint effort between four authors, Bruce Barnes of Oregon, Gerard Murphy, Roger Smyth (former doctoral student) and Trevor. The book appeared in 1982 and has a lasting value that is really noteworthy. It is not so much that the overall thrust of the book is still current, but rather that there are definitions and lemmas in it that remain useful and are not available elsewhere.

Roger Smyth was the first of Trevor's two Ph.D. students and Trevor always spoke enthusiastically about their work together, which spanned many years. Roger was employed as a civil servant in the Northern Ireland Department of Health and Social Services, and so did his Mathematics outside of his working hours. Apart from the fact that Trevor got on very well with Roger, it suited Trevor to have Roger among his Northern Ireland friends and informants on political matters. In a different way, Alastair Gillespie was well placed in Edinburgh where there were rugby matches to attend every now and again, while the Cork connection with Gerard was a different kind of overlap of interests. By the way, the collaboration with Rien Kaashoek did not seem to have any similar coincidence but they did travel often between Dublin and Amsterdam to collaborate. Rainer Nagel of Tübingen was also a close contact of Trevor's but not a co-author.

With regard to the red book, actually entitled Riesz and Fredholm Theory in Banach Algebras and published by Pitman in 1982, Roger Smyth credits Trevor with being the mastermind and driving force behind the book. For instance, Trevor would have been the host for Bruce Barnes during his sabbatical year in Trinity (1979- 0) and Roger also recalls Trevor deciding rather late on that a significant section of the book was not written in the 'right way' and coming up with a new and clearer approach during the final stages of preparation. It seems Trevor also did the management work such as dealing with the publisher and managing the production of the camera- ready copy (in those days using a typist with a golf ball typewriter). Roger's influence on the book is quite clearly related to his doctoral work and subsequent work with Trevor, Bruce Barnes' research at the time was also close to the topics discussed and perhaps Gerard was more interested in the parts where C*-algebras enter. It is appropriate to quote the last paragraph from the Mathematical Review of the book:

'The aim of the authors is "to highlight the interplay between algebra and spectral theory which emerges in any penetrating analysis of compact, Riesz and Fredholm operators on Banach spaces". Their little book proves, among other things, that they have fully (and beautifully) achieved this aim.'

Possibly an important contribution from Gerard Murphy to the book, or maybe something he picked up while engaged in it, was a facility for explaining things particularly well. Later, in 1990, Gerard published a book called C*-algebras and operator theory (Academic Press) which has remained a standard reference. It covers the basics of the theory but also dips in to the more advanced and modern aspects in such a way that many new students of C*-algebras continue to fnd it a valuable introduction, preferable for the beginner to many fatter and more encyclopedic volumes.

This remembrance was added on the eleventh anniversary of Gerard's death by Carol Murphy, Gerard's sister, with permission from Dr Timoney and Maura Lee West (author) The Bold Collegian.

== Publications ==
C*-Algebras and Operator Theory

This book has become a standard textbook in many countries, and is often cited as a reference in research articles. The book was published in 1990 by Academic Press. Its aim is to give an introduction to one of the most dynamic areas of modern mathematics. It is directed at first and second year graduate students intending to specialise in research in operator algebras and at interested researchers from other areas, especially quantum physicists.

He attempted to give an accessible exposition of the core material and to cover a number of topics that have a high contemporary profile. No attempt is made to be encyclopedic but there are notes at the end of each chapter giving additional results not covered in the text. Each chapter also contains a list of problems for the reader to test his or her understanding of the material.

The reader is assumed to have a good background in undergraduate real and complex analysis, point set topology and elementary general functional analysis (Hahn–Banach theorem, uniform boundedness principle, Riesz-Kakutani theorem etc.). However, the theory of locally convex spaces is not presupposed and the requisite material is developed in a short appendix.

In Spring, 1997 a Russian translation of the book appeared. The translation was supervised by Prof. A. Ya. Helemskii of Moscow State University who has also written the preface.

The bibliographic details for ordering the book from its Moscow publisher are as follows:

DJ. Merfi, C*-Algebri i Teoria Operatorov, Izdatelistvo "Factorial", Moskva, 1997.

== Papers ==
The following is a list of most of Gerard's papers published since 1991.

- Ordered groups and crossed products of C*-algebras, Pacific J. Math. 148 (1991), 319–349.
- Derivations mapping into the radical, Arch. Math. 57 (1991), 469—474 (with M. Mathieu).
- Toeplitz operators and algebras, Math. Zeit. 208 (1991), 355–362.
- Spectral and index theory for Toeplitz operators, Proc. Royal Irish Acad. 91A (1991), 1–6.
- The analytic rank of a C*-algebra, Proc. Amer. Math. Soc. 115 (1992), 741–746.
- Almost-invertible Toeplitz operators and K-theory, J. Integr. Equ. Oper. Theory, 15 (1992), 72–81.
- The index group, the exponential spectrum and some spectral containment theorems, Proc. Royal Irish Acad. 92A (1992), 229–238.
- Toeplitz operators on generalised H^2 spaces, J. Integr. Equ. Oper. Theory, 15 (1992), 825–852.
- Inner functions and Toeplitz operators, Canad. Math. Bull. 36 (1993), 324–331.
- An index theorem for Toeplitz operators, J. Operator Theory 29 (1993), 97–114.
- Aspects of the theory of derivations, Funct. Anal. and Operator Theory 30 (1994), 267–275.
- Crossed products of C*-algebras by semigroups of automorphisms, Proc. London Math. Soc. (3) 68 (1994), 423–448.
- Fredholm index theory and the trace, Proc. Royal Irish Acad. 94A (1994), 161–166.
- Translation-invariant function algebras on compact abelian groups, Ann. Acad. Sci. Fennicae 20A (1995), 175–178.
- C*-algebras generated by commuting isometries, Rocky Mountain J. Math. 26 (1996), 237–267.
- C*-algebras with the approximate positive factorisation property, Trans. Amer. Math. Soc. (6) 348 (1996), 2291—2306 (with N.C. Phillips).
- Crossed products of C*-algebras by endomorphisms, J. Integr. Equ. Oper. Theory, 24 (1996), 298–319.
- Extensions of multipliers and dilations of projective isometric representations, Proc. Amer. Math. Soc., 125 (1997), 121–127.
- Type I Toeplitz algebras, J. Integr. Equ. Oper. Theory, 27 (1997), 221–227.
- Products of Toeplitz operators, J. Integr. Equ. Oper. Theory, 27 (1997), 439–445.
- Positive definite kernels and Hilbert C*-modules, Proc. Edinburgh Math. Soc., 40 (1997), 367–374.
- Averaging theorems for linear operators in compact groups and semigroups, Studia Math., 124 (1997), 249—258 (with T.T. West).
- Products of positive operators, Proc. Amer. Math. Soc., 125 (1997), 3675–3677.
- Compact topological semigroups, Proc. Royal Irish Acad., 97A (1997), 131—137 (with K. Abodayeh).
- Unitarily-invariant linear spaces in C*-algebras, Proc. Amer. Math. Soc., 126 (1998), 3597—3605 (with L.W. Marcoux).
- Invariant ideals in Toeplitz algebras, J. Integr. Equ. Oper. Theory, 35 (1999), 118–121.
- Uniqueness of the trace and simplicity, Proc. Amer. Math. Soc., 28 (2000), 3563–3570.
- Co-amenability of compact quantum groups, J. Geom. and Physics, 40 (2001), 129—153 (with E. Bedos and L. Tuset).
- Translation-invariant function algebras on compact groups, Adv. Stud. Contemp. Math., 3 (2001), 39–42.
- Simplicity of crossed products by endomorphisms, J. Integr. Equ. Oper. Theory, 42 (2002), 90–98.
- Amenability and co-amenability of algebraic quantum groups, Int. J. Math. & Math. Sci., 31 (2002), 577—601 (with E. Bedos and L. Tuset).
- Differential calculi over compact quantum groups and twisted cyclic co-cycles, J. Geom. Physics, 44 (2003), 570—594 (with J. Kustermans and L. Tuset).
- Toeplitz operators associated to unimodular algebras, J. Integr. Equ. Oper. Theory 46 (2003), 363–375.
- Amenability and co-amenability of algebraic quantum groups II, J. Funct. Anal. 201 (2003), 303—340 (with J. Kustermans and L. Tuset).
- Differential calculi over quantum groups Noncommutative Geometry and Quantum Groups, Banach Centre Publ. 61 (2003), 157–170.
- Primitivity conditions for the full group C*-algebras, Bull. London Math. Soc. 35 (2003), 697–705.
- The C*-algebra of a function algebra, J. Integr. Equ. Oper. Theory 47 (2003), 361–374.
- Aspects of compact quantum group theory, Proc. Amer. Math. Soc. 132 (2004), 3055—3067 (with L. Tuset).
- The index theory associated to a non-finite trace on a C*-algebra, Canad. Math. Bull. 48 (2005), 252–259.
- Quantum groups, differential calculi and the eigenvalues of the Laplacian, Trans. Amer. Math. Soc. 357 (2005), 4681—4717 (with J. Kustermans and L. Tuset)
- Topological and analytical indices in C*-algebras, J. Funct. Anal. (234) 2006, 261–276.

Note: Gerard has many publications before 1991.

== Sources ==
- Obituary, Oct 16, 2006 from The Irish Times, by Professor Finbarr Holland of University College Cork.
- Staff page for Gerard Murphy at the University College Cork
- Gerard Murphy at the Mathematics Genealogy Project
- Holland, Finbarr (2007), "Gerard J. Murphy (1948—2006)" (PDF), Irish Mathematical Society Bulletin, 0059 (59): 9–27, doi:10.33232/BIMS.0059.9.27, ISSN 0791-5578, MR 2353405
