= Fredholm solvability =

In mathematics, Fredholm solvability encompasses results and techniques for solving differential and integral equations via the Fredholm alternative and, more generally, the Fredholm-type properties of the operator involved. The concept is named after Erik Ivar Fredholm.

Let A be a real n × n-matrix and $b\in\mathbb R^n$ a vector.

The Fredholm alternative in $\mathbb R^n$ states that the equation $Ax=b$ has a solution if and only if $b^T v =0$ for every vector $v\in\mathbb R^n$ satisfying $A^T v =0$. This alternative has many applications, for example, in bifurcation theory. It can be generalized to abstract spaces. So, let $E$ and $F$ be Banach spaces and let $T:E\rightarrow F$ be a continuous linear operator. Let $E^*$, respectively $F^*$, denote the topological dual of $E$, respectively $F$, and let $T^*$ denote the adjoint of $T$ (cf. also Duality; Adjoint operator). Define

$$(\ker T^*)^\perp = \{y\in F:(y,y^*)=0 \text{ for every } y^* \in \ker T^*\}$$

An equation $Tx=y$ is said to be normally solvable (in the sense of F. Hausdorff) if it has a solution whenever $y \in (\ker T^*)^\perp$. A classical result states that $Tx=y$ is normally solvable if and only if $T(E)$ is closed in $F$.

In non-linear analysis, this latter result is used as definition of normal solvability for non-linear operators.
