= Volterra equation =

The Volterra equation may refer to the

- Volterra integral equation, an integral in the style of Fredholm theory.
- Product integral, an integral over an operator-valued function, such as a function into a non-commutative algebra.
