= Hilbert–Schmidt =

In mathematics, Hilbert–Schmidt may refer to

- a Hilbert–Schmidt operator;
  - a Hilbert–Schmidt integral operator;
- the Hilbert–Schmidt theorem.
