= Liouville–Neumann series =

Concept in the theory of integral equations

In mathematics, the Liouville–Neumann series is a function series that results from applying the resolvent formalism to solve Fredholm integral equations in Fredholm theory.

== Definition ==
The Liouville–Neumann series is defined as

$$\phi\left(x\right) = \sum^\infty_{n=0} \lambda^n \phi_n \left(x\right)$$

which, provided that $\lambda$ is small enough so that the series converges, is the unique continuous solution of the Fredholm integral equation of the second kind,

$f(x)= \phi(x) - \lambda \int_a^bK(x,s)\phi(s)\,ds.$

If the nth iterated kernel is defined as n−1 nested integrals of n operator kernels K,

$$K_n\left(x,z\right) = \int\int\cdots\int K\left(x,y_1\right)K\left(y_1,y_2\right) \cdots K\left(y_{n-1}, z\right) dy_1 dy_2 \cdots dy_{n-1}$$

then

$$\phi_n\left(x\right) = \int K_n\left(x,z\right)f\left(z\right)dz$$

with

$$\phi_0\left(x\right) = f\left(x\right)~,$$

so K_{0} may be taken to be δ(x−z), the kernel of the identity operator.

The resolvent, also called the "solution kernel" for the integral operator, is then given by a generalization of the geometric series,

$$R\left(x, z;\lambda\right) = \sum^\infty_{n=0} \lambda^n K_{n} \left(x, z\right),$$

where K_{0} is again δ(x−z).

The solution of the integral equation thus becomes simply

$$\phi\left(x\right) = \int R\left( x, z;\lambda\right) f\left(z\right)dz.$$

Similar methods may be used to solve the Volterra integral equations.

== See also ==
- Neumann series
