= Fredholm alternative =

One of Fredholm's theorems in mathematics

In mathematics, the Fredholm alternative, named after Ivar Fredholm, is one of Fredholm's theorems and is a result in Fredholm theory. It may be expressed in several ways, as a theorem of linear algebra, a theorem of integral equations, or as a theorem on Fredholm operators. Part of the result states that a non-zero complex number in the spectrum of a compact operator is an eigenvalue.

== Linear algebra ==
If $V$ is a $n$-dimensional vector space, with $n$ finite, and $T:V\to V$ is a linear transformation, then exactly one of the following holds:

1. For each vector $v$ in $V$ there is a vector $u$ in $V$ so that $T(u) = v$. In other words: $T$ is surjective (and so also bijective, since $V$ is finite-dimensional).
2. $\dim(\ker(T)) > 0.$

A more elementary formulation, in terms of matrices, is as follows. Given an $m \times n$ matrix $A$ and a $m \times 1$ column vector $\mathbf{b}$, exactly one of the following must hold:

1. Either: $A \mathbf{x} = \mathbf{b}$ has a solution $\mathbf{x}$
2. Or: $A^T \mathbf{y} = 0$ has a solution $\mathbf{y}$ with $\mathbf{y}^T\mathbf{b} \neq 0$.

In other words, $A \mathbf{x} = \mathbf{b}$ has a solution $(\mathbf{b} \in \operatorname{Im}(A))$ if and only if for any $\mathbf{y}$ such that $A^T \mathbf{y} = 0$, it follows that $\mathbf{y}^T\mathbf{b} = 0$ $(i.e., \mathbf{b} \in \ker(A^T)^{\bot})$.

== Integral equations ==
Let $K(x,y)$ be an integral kernel, and consider the homogeneous equation, the Fredholm integral equation,

$$\lambda \varphi(x)- \int_a^b K(x,y) \varphi(y) \,dy = 0$$

and the inhomogeneous equation

$$\lambda \varphi(x) - \int_a^b K(x,y) \varphi(y) \,dy = f(x).$$

The Fredholm alternative is the statement that, for every non-zero fixed complex number $\lambda \in \mathbb{C},$ either the first equation has a non-trivial solution, or the second equation has a solution for all $f(x)$.

A sufficient condition for this statement to be true is for $K(x,y)$ to be square integrable on the rectangle $[a,b]\times[a,b]$ (where a and/or b may be minus or plus infinity). The integral operator defined by such a K is called a Hilbert–Schmidt integral operator.

== Functional analysis ==
Results about Fredholm operators generalize these results to complete normed vector spaces of infinite dimensions; that is, Banach spaces.

The integral equation can be reformulated in terms of operator notation as follows. Write (somewhat informally)
$$T = \lambda - K$$
to mean
$$T(x,y) = \lambda\; \delta(x-y) - K(x,y)$$
with $\delta(x-y)$ the Dirac delta function, considered as a distribution, or generalized function, in two variables. Then by convolution, $T$ induces a linear operator acting on a Banach space $V$ of functions $\varphi(x)$
$$V \to V$$
given by
$$\varphi \mapsto \psi$$
with $\psi$ given by
$$\psi(x)=\int_a^b T(x,y) \varphi(y) \,dy = \lambda\;\varphi(x) - \int_a^b K(x,y) \varphi(y) \,dy.$$

In this language, the Fredholm alternative for integral equations is seen to be analogous to the Fredholm alternative for finite-dimensional linear algebra.

The operator $K$ given by convolution with an $L^2$ kernel, as above, is known as a Hilbert–Schmidt integral operator. Such operators are always compact. More generally, the Fredholm alternative is valid when $K$ is any compact operator. The Fredholm alternative may be restated in the following form: a nonzero $\lambda$ either is an eigenvalue of $K,$ or lies in the domain of the resolvent
$$R(\lambda; K) = (K-\lambda \operatorname{Id})^{-1}.$$

== Elliptic partial differential equations ==
The Fredholm alternative can be applied to solving linear elliptic boundary value problems. The basic result is: if the equation and the appropriate Banach spaces have been set up correctly, then either

(1) The homogeneous equation has a nontrivial solution, or

(2) The inhomogeneous equation can be solved uniquely for each choice of data.

The argument goes as follows. A typical simple-to-understand elliptic operator $L$ would be the Laplacian plus some lower order terms. Combined with suitable boundary conditions and expressed on a suitable Banach space $X$ (which encodes both the boundary conditions and the desired regularity of the solution), $L$ becomes an unbounded operator from $X$ to itself, and one attempts to solve

$$L u = f,\qquad u\in \operatorname{dom}(L) \subseteq X,$$

where $f \in X$ is some function serving as data for which we want a solution. The Fredholm alternative, together with the theory of elliptic equations, will enable us to organize the solutions of this equation.

A concrete example would be an elliptic boundary-value problem like

$$(*)\qquad Lu := -\Delta u + h(x) u = f\qquad \text{in }\Omega,$$

supplemented with the boundary condition

$$(**) \qquad u = 0 \qquad \text{on } \partial\Omega,$$

where $\Omega \subseteq \mathbf{R}^n$ is a bounded open set with smooth boundary and $h$ is a fixed coefficient function (a potential, in the case of a Schrödinger operator). The function $f \in X$ is the variable data for which we wish to solve the equation. Here one would take $X$ to be the space $L^2(\Omega)$ of all square-integrable functions on $\Omega$, and $\operatorname{dom}(L)$ is then the Sobolev space $W^{2,2}(\Omega) \cap W_0^{1,2}(\Omega)$, which amounts to the set of all square-integrable functions on $\Omega$ whose weak first and second derivatives exist and are square-integrable, and which satisfy a zero boundary condition on $\partial\Omega$.

If $X$ has been selected correctly (as it has in this example), then for $\mu_0 \gg 0$ the operator $L + \mu_0$ is positive, and then employing elliptic estimates, one can prove that $L + \mu_0 : \operatorname{dom}(L) \to X$ is a bijection, and its inverse is a compact, everywhere-defined operator $K$ from $X$ to $X$, with image equal to $\operatorname{dom}(L)$. We fix one such $\mu_0$, but its value is not important as it is only a tool.

We may then transform the Fredholm alternative, stated above for compact operators, into a statement about the solvability of the boundary-value problem (*)–(**). The Fredholm alternative, as stated above, asserts:

- For each $\lambda \in \mathbf{R}$, either $\lambda$ is an eigenvalue of $K$, or the operator $K - \lambda$ is bijective from $X$ to itself.

Let us explore the two alternatives as they play out for the boundary-value problem. Suppose $\lambda \neq 0$. Then either

(A) $\lambda$ is an eigenvalue of $K$ $\Leftrightarrow$ there is a solution $h \in \operatorname{dom}(L)$ of $(L + \mu_0)h = \lambda^{-1}h$ $\Leftrightarrow$ $-\mu_0 + \lambda^{-1}$ is an eigenvalue of $L$.

(B) The operator $K - \lambda : X \to X$ is a bijection $\Leftrightarrow$ $(K - \lambda)(L + \mu_0) = \operatorname{Id} - \lambda(L + \mu_0) : \operatorname{dom}(L) \to X$ is a bijection $\Leftrightarrow$ $L + \mu_0 - \lambda^{-1} : \operatorname{dom}(L) \to X$ is a bijection.

Replacing $-\mu_0 + \lambda^{-1}$ by $\lambda$, and treating the case $\lambda = -\mu_0$ separately, this yields the following Fredholm alternative for an elliptic boundary-value problem:

- For each $\lambda \in \mathbf{R}$, either the homogeneous equation $(L - \lambda)u = 0$ has a nontrivial solution, or the inhomogeneous equation $(L - \lambda)u = f$ possesses a unique solution $u \in \operatorname{dom}(L)$ for each given datum $f \in X$.

The latter function $u$ solves the boundary-value problem (*)–(**) introduced above. This is the dichotomy that was claimed in (1)–(2) above. By the spectral theorem for compact operators, one also obtains that the set of $\lambda$ for which the solvability fails is a discrete subset of $\mathbf{R}$ (the eigenvalues of $L$). The eigenvalues’ associated eigenfunctions can be thought of as "resonances" that block the solvability of the equation.

== See also ==
- Spectral theory of compact operators
- Farkas' lemma
