= Operator ideal =

In functional analysis, a branch of mathematics, an operator ideal is a special kind of class of continuous linear operators between Banach spaces. If an operator $T$ belongs to an operator ideal $\mathcal{J}$, then for any operators $A$ and $B$ which can be composed with $T$ as $BTA$, then $BTA$ is class $\mathcal{J}$ as well. Additionally, in order for $\mathcal{J}$ to be an operator ideal, it must contain the class of all finite-rank Banach space operators.

== Formal definition ==
Let $\mathcal{L}$ denote the class of continuous linear operators acting between arbitrary Banach spaces. For any subclass $\mathcal{J}$ of $\mathcal{L}$ and any two Banach spaces $X$ and $Y$ over the same field $\mathbb{K}\in\{\mathbb{R},\mathbb{C}\}$, denote by $\mathcal{J}(X,Y)$ the set of continuous linear operators of the form $T:X\to Y$ such that $T \in \mathcal{J}$. In this case, we say that $\mathcal{J}(X,Y)$ is a component of $\mathcal{J}$. An operator ideal is a subclass $\mathcal{J}$ of $\mathcal{L}$, containing every identity operator acting on a 1-dimensional Banach space, such that for any two Banach spaces $X$ and $Y$ over the same field $\mathbb{K}$, the following two conditions for $\mathcal{J}(X,Y)$ are satisfied:

(1) If $S,T\in\mathcal{J}(X,Y)$ then $S+T\in\mathcal{J}(X,Y)$; and
(2) if $W$ and $Z$ are Banach spaces over $\mathbb{K}$ with $A\in\mathcal{L}(W,X)$ and $B\in\mathcal{L}(Y,Z)$, and if $T\in\mathcal{J}(X,Y)$, then $BTA\in\mathcal{J}(W,Z)$.

== Properties and examples ==
Operator ideals enjoy the following nice properties.

- Every component $\mathcal{J}(X,Y)$ of an operator ideal forms a linear subspace of $\mathcal{L}(X,Y)$, although in general this need not be norm-closed.
- Every operator ideal contains all finite-rank operators. In particular, the finite-rank operators form the smallest operator ideal.
- For each operator ideal $\mathcal{J}$, every component of the form $\mathcal{J}(X):=\mathcal{J}(X,X)$ forms an ideal in the algebraic sense.

Furthermore, some very well-known classes are norm-closed operator ideals, i.e., operator ideals whose components are always norm-closed. These include but are not limited to the following.

- Compact operators
- Weakly compact operators
- Finitely strictly singular operators
- Strictly singular operators
- Completely continuous operators
