= Fredholm kernel =

In mathematics, a Fredholm kernel is a certain type of a kernel on a Banach space, associated with nuclear operators on the Banach space. They are an abstraction of the idea of the Fredholm integral equation and the Fredholm operator, and are one of the objects of study in Fredholm theory. Fredholm kernels are named in honour of Erik Ivar Fredholm. Much of the abstract theory of Fredholm kernels was developed by Alexander Grothendieck and published in 1955.

== Definition ==
Let B be an arbitrary Banach space, and let B^{*} be its dual, that is, the space of bounded linear functionals on B. The tensor product $B^*\otimes B$ has a completion under the norm

$$\Vert X \Vert_\pi =
\inf \sum_{\{i\}} \Vert e^*_i\Vert \Vert e_i \Vert$$

where the infimum is taken over all finite representations

$$X=\sum_{\{i\}} e^*_i \otimes e_i \in B^*\otimes B$$

The completion, under this norm, is often denoted as

$$B^* \widehat{\,\otimes\,}_\pi B$$

and is called the projective topological tensor product. The elements of this space are called Fredholm kernels.

== Properties ==
Every Fredholm kernel has a representation in the form

$$X=\sum_{\{i\}} \lambda_i e^*_i \otimes e_i$$

with $e_i \in B$ and $e^*_i \in B^*$ such that $\Vert e_i \Vert = \Vert e^*_i \Vert = 1$ and

$$\sum_{\{i\}} \vert \lambda_i \vert < \infty. \,$$

Associated with each such kernel is a linear operator

$$\mathcal {L}_X : B \to B$$

which has the canonical representation

$$\mathcal{L}_X f =\sum_{\{i\}} \lambda_i e^*_i(f) e_i. \,$$

Associated with every Fredholm kernel is a trace, defined as

$$\mbox{tr} X = \sum_{\{i\}} \lambda_i e^*_i(e_i). \,$$

== p-summable kernels ==
A Fredholm kernel is said to be p-summable if

$$\sum_{\{i\}} \vert \lambda_i \vert^p < \infty.$$

A Fredholm kernel is said to be of order q if q is the infimum of all $0<p\le 1$ for all p for which it is p-summable.

== Nuclear operators on Banach spaces ==
An operator L : B→B is said to be a nuclear operator if there exists an X ∈ $B^* \widehat{\,\otimes\,}_\pi B$ such that L = L_{X}. Such an operator is said to be p-summable and of order q if X is. In general, there may be more than one X associated with such a nuclear operator, and so the trace is not uniquely defined. However, if the order q ≤ 2/3, then there is a unique trace, as given by a theorem of Grothendieck.

== Grothendieck's theorem ==
If $\mathcal{L}:B\to B$ is an operator of order $q \le 2/3$ then a trace may be defined, with

$$\mbox{Tr} \mathcal {L} = \sum_{\{i\}} \rho_i$$

where $\rho_i$ are the eigenvalues of $\mathcal{L}$. Furthermore, the Fredholm determinant

$$\det \left( 1-z\mathcal{L}\right)=
\prod_i \left(1-\rho_i z \right)$$

is an entire function of z. The formula

$$\det \left( 1-z\mathcal{L}\right)=
\exp \mbox{Tr} \log\left( 1-z\mathcal{L}\right)$$

holds as well. Finally, if $\mathcal{L}$ is parameterized by some complex-valued parameter w, that is, $\mathcal{L}=\mathcal{L}_w$, and the parameterization is holomorphic on some domain, then

$$\det \left( 1-z\mathcal{L}_w\right)$$

is holomorphic on the same domain.

== Examples ==
An important example is the Banach space of holomorphic functions over a domain $D\subset \mathbb{C}^k$. In this space, every nuclear operator is of order zero, and is thus of trace-class.

== Nuclear spaces ==
The idea of a nuclear operator can be adapted to Fréchet spaces. A nuclear space is a Fréchet space where every bounded map of the space to an arbitrary Banach space is nuclear.
