= Hilbert operator =

Hilbert operator may refer to:

- The epsilon operator in Hilbert's epsilon calculus
- The Hilbert–Schmidt operators on a Hilbert space
  - Hilbert–Schmidt integral operators
  - Generally, any operator on a Hilbert space
