= Erik Ivar Fredholm =

Swedish mathematician (1866–1927)

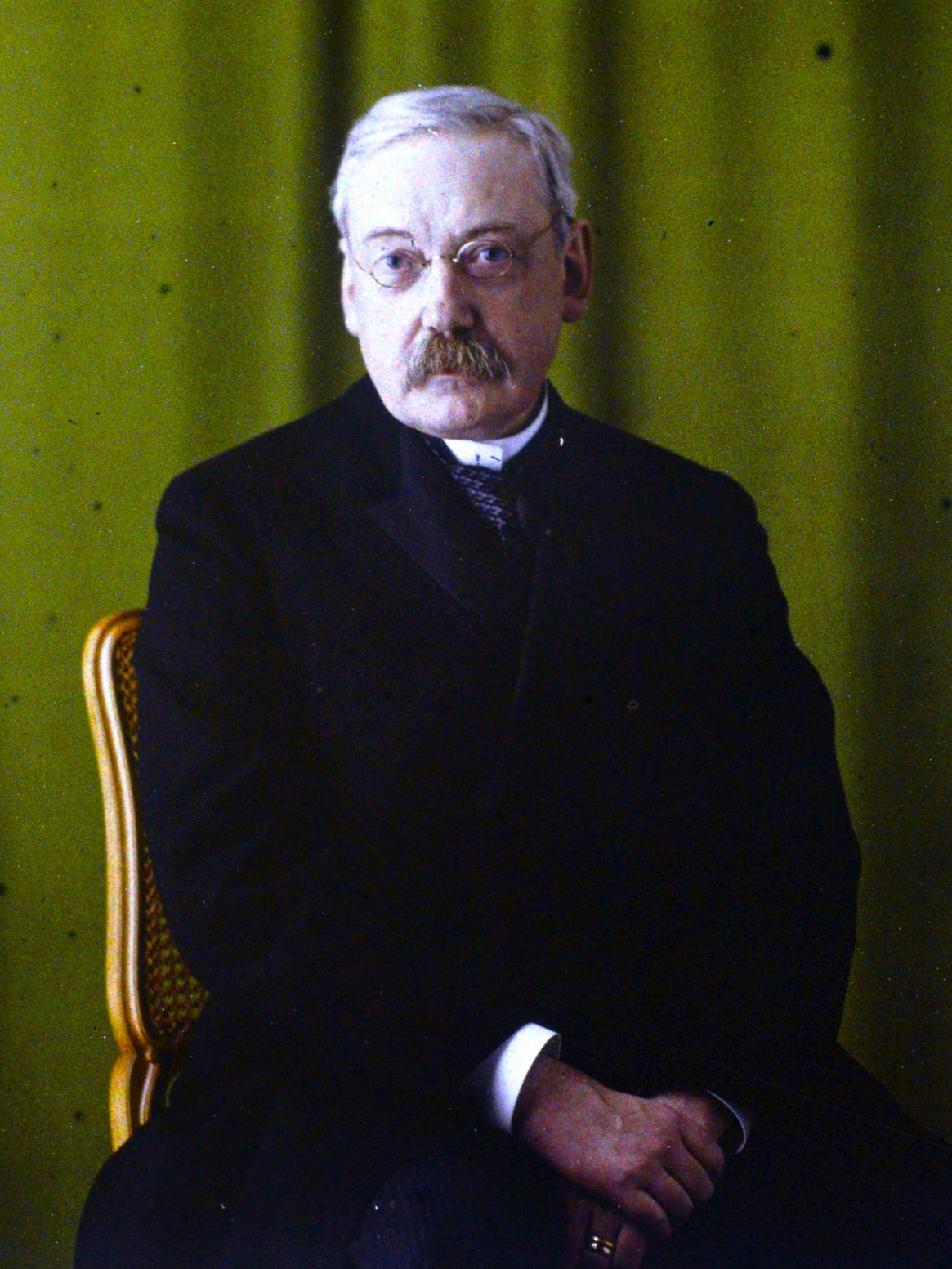
- Autochrome by Auguste Léon, 1921
- Born: 7 April 1866; Stockholm, Sweden
- Died: 17 August 1927 (aged 61); Mörby (near Stockholm), Sweden
- Known for: Analytic Fredholm theorem Fredholm alternative Fredholm determinant Fredholm equation Fredholm kernel Fredholm module Fredholm operator Fredholm solvability Fredholm's theorem Fredholm theory Resolvent formalism
- Awards: Björkénska priset (1910)
- Scientific career
- Fields: Mathematics
- Doctoral advisor: Gösta Mittag-Leffler
- Doctoral students: Carl-Gustaf Rossby; Nils Zeilon

Erik Ivar Fredholm (7 April 1866 – 17 August 1927) was a Swedish mathematician whose work on integral equations and operator theory foreshadowed the theory of Hilbert spaces.

== Biography ==
Fredholm was born in Stockholm in 1866. He obtained his PhD at Uppsala University in 1898, under the supervision of Gösta Mittag-Leffler. He was docent at Stockholm University from 1898 to 1906 and professor from 1906 until his death. In 1914 he was elected a member of the Royal Swedish Academy of Sciences and in 1922 a foreign member of the Finnish Society of Sciences and Letters. Beside his academic career he was recruited to the Swedish Social Insurance Agency when it was founded in 1902. He later served as an actuary at the insurance company Skandia (1904-1927), where his Fredholm equation was used to calculate buyback-prices.

From 1911, he was married to Agnes Maria Liljeblad, the secretary of Mittag-Leffler.

== Mathematical work ==
In (Fredholm 1900, 1903), Fredholm introduced and analysed a class of integral equations now called Fredholm equations. His analysis included the construction of Fredholm determinants, and the proof of the Fredholm theorems.

== Honours ==
Fredholm was a member of the Finnish Society of Sciences and Letters and of the Accademia dei Lincei; he was awarded the Poncelet Prize for 1908.

The lunar crater Fredholm is named after him as is the asteroid 21659 Fredholm.

== Publications ==
- Fredholm, I. (1900). "Sur une nouvelle méthode pour la résolution du problème de Dirichlet". Kong. Vetenskaps-Akademiens FBRH. Stockholm (in French): 39–46. JFM 32.0435.02.
- Fredholm, E.I. (1903). "Sur une classe d'équations fonctionnelles" (PDF). Acta Math. 27: 365–390. doi:10.1007/bf02421317. JFM 34.0422.02.
- Fredholm, I. (1955). Oeuvres complètes. Malmd: Litos Reprotryck.
