= Strictly singular operator =

In functional analysis, a branch of mathematics, a strictly singular operator is a bounded linear operator between normed spaces which is not bounded below on any infinite-dimensional subspace.

== Definitions. ==
Let X and Y be normed linear spaces, and denote by B(X,Y) the space of bounded operators of the form $T:X\to Y$. Let $A\subseteq X$ be any subset. We say that T is bounded below on $A$ whenever there is a constant $c\in(0,\infty)$ such that for all $x\in A$, the inequality $\|Tx\|\geq c\|x\|$ holds. If A=X, we say simply that T is bounded below.

Now suppose X and Y are Banach spaces, and let $\operatorname{Id}_X\in B(X)$ and $\operatorname{Id}_Y\in B(Y)$ denote the respective identity operators. An operator $T\in B(X,Y)$ is called inessential whenever $\operatorname{Id}_X-ST$ is a Fredholm operator for every $S\in B(Y,X)$. Equivalently, T is inessential if and only if $\operatorname{Id}_Y-TS$ is Fredholm for every $S\in B(Y,X)$. Denote by $\mathcal{E}(X,Y)$ the set of all inessential operators in $B(X,Y)$.

An operator $T\in B(X,Y)$ is called strictly singular whenever it fails to be bounded below on any infinite-dimensional subspace of X. Denote by $\mathcal{SS}(X,Y)$ the set of all strictly singular operators in $B(X,Y)$. We say that $T\in B(X,Y)$ is finitely strictly singular whenever for each $\epsilon>0$ there exists $n\in\mathbb{N}$ such that for every subspace E of X satisfying $\text{dim}(E)\geq n$, there is $x\in E$ such that $\|Tx\|<\epsilon\|x\|$. Denote by $\mathcal{FSS}(X,Y)$ the set of all finitely strictly singular operators in $B(X,Y)$.

Let $B_X=\{x\in X:\|x\|\leq 1\}$ denote the closed unit ball in X. An operator $T\in B(X,Y)$ is compact whenever $TB_X=\{Tx:x\in B_X\}$ is a relatively norm-compact subset of Y, and denote by $\mathcal{K}(X,Y)$ the set of all such compact operators.

== Properties. ==
Strictly singular operators can be viewed as a generalization of compact operators, as every compact operator is strictly singular. These two classes share some important properties. For example, if X is a Banach space and T is a strictly singular operator in B(X) then its spectrum $\sigma(T)$ satisfies the following properties: (i) the cardinality of $\sigma(T)$ is at most countable; (ii) $0\in\sigma(T)$ (except possibly in the trivial case where X is finite-dimensional); (iii) zero is the only possible limit point of $\sigma(T)$; and (iv) every nonzero $\lambda\in\sigma(T)$ is an eigenvalue. This same "spectral theorem" consisting of (i)-(iv) is satisfied for inessential operators in B(X).

Classes $\mathcal{K}$, $\mathcal{FSS}$, $\mathcal{SS}$, and $\mathcal{E}$ all form norm-closed operator ideals. This means, whenever X and Y are Banach spaces, the component spaces $\mathcal{K}(X,Y)$, $\mathcal{FSS}(X,Y)$, $\mathcal{SS}(X,Y)$, and $\mathcal{E}(X,Y)$ are each closed subspaces (in the operator norm) of B(X,Y), such that the classes are invariant under composition with arbitrary bounded linear operators.

In general, we have $\mathcal{K}(X,Y)\subset\mathcal{FSS}(X,Y)\subset\mathcal{SS}(X,Y)\subset\mathcal{E}(X,Y)$, and each of the inclusions may or may not be strict, depending on the choices of X and Y.

=== Examples. ===
Every bounded linear map $T:\ell_p\to \ell_q$, for $1\le q, p < \infty$, $p\ne q$, is strictly singular. Here, $\ell_p$ and $\ell_q$ are sequence spaces. Similarly, every bounded linear map $T:c_0\to\ell_p$ and $T:\ell_p\to c_0$, for $1\le p < \infty$, is strictly singular. Here $c_0$ is the Banach space of sequences converging to zero. This is a corollary of Pitt's theorem, which states that such T, for q < p, are compact.

If $1\leq p<q<\infty$ then the formal identity operator $I_{p,q}\in B(\ell_p,\ell_q)$ is finitely strictly singular but not compact. If $1<p<q<\infty$ then there exist "Pelczynski operators" in $B(\ell_p,\ell_q)$ which are uniformly bounded below on copies of $\ell_2^n$, $n\in\mathbb{N}$, and hence are strictly singular but not finitely strictly singular. In this case we have $\mathcal{K}(\ell_p,\ell_q)\subsetneq\mathcal{FSS}(\ell_p,\ell_q)\subsetneq\mathcal{SS}(\ell_p,\ell_q)$. However, every inessential operator with codomain $\ell_q$ is strictly singular, so that $\mathcal{SS}(\ell_p,\ell_q)=\mathcal{E}(\ell_p,\ell_q)$. On the other hand, if X is any separable Banach space then there exists a bounded below operator $T\in B(X,\ell_\infty)$ any of which is inessential but not strictly singular. Thus, in particular, $\mathcal{K}(\ell_p,\ell_\infty)\subsetneq\mathcal{FSS}(\ell_p,\ell_\infty)\subsetneq\mathcal{SS}(\ell_p,\ell_\infty)\subsetneq\mathcal{E}(\ell_p,\ell_\infty)$ for all $1<p<\infty$.

=== Duality. ===
The compact operators form a symmetric ideal, which means $T\in\mathcal{K}(X,Y)$ if and only if $T^*\in\mathcal{K}(Y^*,X^*)$. However, this is not the case for classes $\mathcal{FSS}$, $\mathcal{SS}$, or $\mathcal{E}$. To establish duality relations, we will introduce additional classes.

If Z is a closed subspace of a Banach space Y then there exists a "canonical" surjection $Q_Z:Y\to Y/Z$ defined via the natural mapping $y\mapsto y+Z$. An operator $T\in B(X,Y)$ is called strictly cosingular whenever given an infinite-codimensional closed subspace Z of Y, the map $Q_ZT$ fails to be surjective. Denote by $\mathcal{SCS}(X,Y)$ the subspace of strictly cosingular operators in B(X,Y).

Theorem 1. Let X and Y be Banach spaces, and let $T\in B(X,Y)$. If T* is strictly singular (resp. strictly cosingular) then T is strictly cosingular (resp. strictly singular).

Note that there are examples of strictly singular operators whose adjoints are neither strictly singular nor strictly cosingular (see Plichko, 2004). Similarly, there are strictly cosingular operators whose adjoints are not strictly singular, e.g. the inclusion map $I:c_0\to\ell_\infty$. So $\mathcal{SS}$ is not in full duality with $\mathcal{SCS}$.

Theorem 2. Let X and Y be Banach spaces, and let $T\in B(X,Y)$. If T* is inessential then so is T.
