= Square-summable =

Square-summable may refer to:

- Square-integrable functions
- Square-summable sequences; see Hilbert space § Sequence spaces
