= Hilbert–Schmidt theorem =

In mathematical analysis, the Hilbert–Schmidt theorem, also known as the eigenfunction expansion theorem, is a fundamental result concerning compact, self-adjoint operators on Hilbert spaces. In the theory of partial differential equations, it is very useful in solving elliptic boundary value problems.

== Statement of the theorem ==
Let $(H, \left\langle \cdot, \cdot \right\rangle)$ be a real or complex Hilbert space and let $A: H \rightarrow H$ be a bounded, compact, self-adjoint operator. Then there is a sequence of non-zero real eigenvalues $\lambda_1, \lambda_2, \dots, \lambda_N$ with $N$ equal to the rank of $A$, such that $|\lambda_i|$ is monotonically non-increasing and, if $N = +\infty$,
$$\lim_{i \to + \infty} \lambda_{i} = 0.$$

Furthermore, if each eigenvalue of A is repeated in the sequence according to its multiplicity, then there exists an orthonormal set φ_{i}, i = 1, …, N, of corresponding eigenfunctions, i.e.,
$$A \varphi_{i} = \lambda_{i} \varphi_{i} \mbox{ for } i = 1, \dots, N.$$

Moreover, the functions φ_{i} form an orthonormal basis for the range of A and A can be written as
$$A u = \sum_{i = 1}^{N} \lambda_{i} \langle \varphi_{i}, u \rangle \varphi_{i} \mbox{ for all } u \in H.$$
