= Fredholm integral equation =

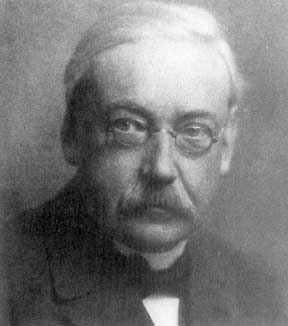
Ivar Fredholm, mathematician

In mathematics, the Fredholm integral equation is an integral equation whose solution gives rise to Fredholm theory, the study of Fredholm kernels and Fredholm operators. The integral equation was studied by Ivar Fredholm. A useful method to solve such type of equations, the Adomian decomposition method, is due to George Adomian.

== Equation of the first kind ==
A Fredholm equation is an integral equation in which the term containing the kernel function (defined below) has constants as integration limits. A closely related form is the Volterra integral equation which has variable integral limits.

An inhomogeneous Fredholm equation of the first kind is written as

$g(t)=\int_a^b K(t,s)f(s)\,\mathrm{d}s ~,$

and the problem is, given the continuous kernel function $K$ and the function $g$, to find the function $f$.

An important case of these types of equation is the case when the kernel is a function only of the difference of its arguments, namely $K(t,s)=K(t-s)$, and the limits of integration are ±∞, then the right hand side of the equation can be rewritten as a convolution of the functions $K$ and $f$ and therefore, formally, the solution is given by

$$f(s) =  \mathcal{F}_\omega^{-1}\left[
{\mathcal{F}_t[g(t)](\omega)\over
\mathcal{F}_t[K(t)](\omega)}
\right]=\int_{-\infty}^\infty {\mathcal{F}_t[g(t)](\omega)\over
\mathcal{F}_t[K(t)](\omega)}e^{2\pi i \omega s} \mathrm{d}\omega$$

where $\mathcal{F}_t$ and $\mathcal{F}_\omega^{-1}$ are the direct and inverse Fourier transforms, respectively. This case would not be typically included under the umbrella of Fredholm integral equations, a name that is usually reserved for when the integral operator defines a compact operator (convolution operators on non-compact groups are non-compact, since, in general, the spectrum of the operator of convolution with $K$ contains the range of $\mathcal{F}{K}$, which is usually a non-countable set, whereas compact operators have discrete countable spectra).

== Equation of the second kind ==
An inhomogeneous Fredholm equation of the second kind is given as

$\varphi(t)= f(t) + \lambda \int_a^bK(t,s)\varphi(s)\,\mathrm{d}s.$

Given the kernel $K(t,s)$, and the function $f(t)$, the problem is typically to find the function $\varphi(t)$.

A standard approach to solving this is to use iteration, amounting to the resolvent formalism; written as a series, the solution is known as the Liouville–Neumann series.

== General theory ==
The general theory underlying the Fredholm equations is known as Fredholm theory. One of the principal results is that the kernel K yields a compact operator. Compactness may be shown by invoking equicontinuity, and more specifically the theorem of Arzelà-Ascoli. As an operator, it has a spectral theory that can be understood in terms of a discrete spectrum of eigenvalues that tend to 0.

== Applications ==
Fredholm equations arise naturally in the theory of signal processing, for example as the famous spectral concentration problem popularized by David Slepian. The operators involved are the same as linear filters. They also commonly arise in linear forward modeling and inverse problems. In physics, the solution of such integral equations allows for experimental spectra to be related to various underlying distributions, for instance the mass distribution of polymers in a polymeric melt, or the distribution of relaxation times in the system. In addition, Fredholm integral equations also arise in fluid mechanics problems involving hydrodynamic interactions near finite-sized elastic interfaces.

A specific application of Fredholm equation is the generation of photo-realistic images in computer graphics, in which the Fredholm equation is used to model light transport from the virtual light sources to the image plane. The Fredholm equation is often called the rendering equation in this context.

== See also ==
- Liouville–Neumann series
- Volterra integral equation
- Fredholm alternative
