= Toeplitz operator =

In operator theory, a Toeplitz operator is the compression of a multiplication operator on the circle to the Hardy space.

== Details ==
Let $S^1$ be the unit circle in the complex plane, with the standard Lebesgue measure, and $L^2(S^1)$ be the Hilbert space of complex-valued square-integrable functions. A bounded measurable complex-valued function $g$ on $S^1$ defines a multiplication operator $M_g$ on $L^2(S^1)$ . Let $P$ be the projection from $L^2(S^1)$ onto the Hardy space $H^2$. The Toeplitz operator with symbol $g$ is defined by

$$T_g = P M_g \vert_{H^2},$$

where " | " means restriction.

A bounded operator on $H^2$ is Toeplitz if and only if its matrix representation, in the basis $\{z^n, z \in \mathbb{C}, n \geq 0\}$, has constant diagonals.

== Theorems ==
- Theorem: If $g$ is continuous, then $T_g - \lambda$ is Fredholm if and only if $\lambda$ is not in the set $g(S^1)$. If it is Fredholm, its index is minus the winding number of the curve traced out by $g$ with respect to the origin.

For a proof, see Douglas (1972, p.185). He attributes the theorem to Mark Krein, Harold Widom, and Allen Devinatz. This can be thought of as an important special case of the Atiyah-Singer index theorem.

- Axler-Chang-Sarason Theorem: The operator $T_f T_g - T_{fg}$ is compact if and only if $H^\infty[\bar f] \cap H^\infty [g] \subseteq H^\infty + C^0(S^1)$.

Here, $H^\infty$ denotes the closed subalgebra of $L^\infty (S^1)$ of analytic functions (functions with vanishing negative Fourier coefficients), $H^\infty [f]$ is the closed subalgebra of $L^\infty (S^1)$ generated by $f$ and $H^\infty$, and $C^0(S^1)$ is the space (as an algebraic set) of continuous functions on the circle. See S.Axler, S-Y. Chang, D. Sarason (1978).

== See also ==
- Toeplitz matrix – Matrix with shifting rows
