= Volterra integral equation =

Operator equation in the style of Fredholm theory

In mathematics, the Volterra integral equations are a special type of integral equations, named after Vito Volterra. They are divided into two groups referred to as the first and the second kind.

A linear Volterra equation of the first kind is

$$f(t) = \int_a^t K(t,s)\,x(s)\,ds$$

where $f(t)$ is a given function and $x(t)$ is to be determined. A linear Volterra equation of the second kind is

$$x(t) = f(t) + \int_a^t K(t,s)x(s)\,ds.$$

In operator theory, and in Fredholm theory, the corresponding operators are called Volterra operators. A useful method to solve such equations, the Adomian decomposition method, is due to George Adomian.

A linear Volterra integral equation is a convolution equation if

$$x(t) = f(t) + \int_{t_0}^t K(t-s)x(s)\,ds.$$

The function $K$ in the integral is called the kernel. Such equations can be analyzed and solved by means of Laplace transform techniques.

For a weakly singular kernel of the form $K(t,s) = (t^2-s^2)^{-\alpha}$ with $0<\alpha<1$, Volterra integral equation of the first kind can conveniently be transformed into a classical Abel integral equation.

The Volterra integral equations were introduced by Vito Volterra and then studied by Traian Lalescu in his 1908 thesis, Sur les équations de Volterra, written under the direction of Émile Picard. In 1911, Lalescu wrote the first book ever on integral equations.

Volterra integral equations find application in demography as Lotka's integral equation, the study of viscoelastic materials, in actuarial science through the renewal equation, and in fluid mechanics to describe the flow behavior near finite-sized boundaries.

== Conversion of Volterra equation of the first kind to the second kind ==
A linear Volterra equation of the first kind can always be reduced to a linear Volterra equation of the second kind, assuming that $K(t,t) \neq 0$. Taking the derivative of the first kind Volterra equation gives us:
$${df\over{dt}} = \int_{a}^{t}{\partial K\over{\partial t}}x(s)ds + K(t,t)x(t)$$
Dividing through by $K(t,t)$ yields:
$$x(t) = {1\over{K(t,t)}}{df\over{dt}} - \int_{a}^{t}{1\over{K(t,t)}}{\partial K\over{\partial t}}x(s)ds$$
Defining $\widetilde{f}(t) = {1\over{K(t,t)}}{df\over{dt}}$ and $\widetilde{K}(t,s) = -{1\over{K(t,t)}}{\partial K\over{\partial t}}$ completes the transformation of the first kind equation into a linear Volterra equation of the second kind.

== Numerical solution using trapezoidal rule ==
A standard method for computing the numerical solution of a linear Volterra equation of the second kind is the trapezoidal rule, which for equally-spaced subintervals $\Delta x$ is given by:
$$\int_{a}^{b}f(x)dx \approx {\Delta x\over{2}}\left[f(x_{0}) + 2\sum_{i=1}^{n-1} f(x_{i}) + f(x_{n}) \right ]$$
Assuming equal spacing for the subintervals, the integral component of the Volterra equation may be approximated by:
$$\int_{a}^{t}K(t,s)x(s)ds \approx {\Delta s\over{2}}\left[K(t,s_{0})x(s_{0}) + 2K(t,s_{1})x(s_{1}) + \cdots + 2K(t,s_{n-1})x(s_{n-1}) + K(t,s_{n})x(s_{n}) \right ]$$
Defining $x_{i} = x(s_{i})$, $f_{i} = f(t_{i})$, and $K_{ij} = K(t_{i},s_{j})$, we have the system of linear equations:
$$\begin{aligned}
x_{0} &= f_{0} \\
x_{1} &= f_{1} + {\Delta s\over{2}}\left(K_{10}x_{0} + K_{11}x_{1} \right ) \\
x_{2} &= f_{2} + {\Delta s\over{2}}\left(K_{20}x_{0} + 2K_{21}x_{1} + K_{22}x_{2} \right ) \\
&\vdots \\
x_{n} &= f_{n} + {\Delta s\over{2}}\left(K_{n0}x_{0} + 2K_{n1}x_{1} + \cdots + 2K_{n,n-1}x_{n-1} + K_{nn}x_{n} \right )
\end{aligned}$$
This is equivalent to the matrix equation:
$$x = f + Mx \implies x = (I-M)^{-1}f$$
For well-behaved kernels, the trapezoidal rule tends to work well.

== Application: Ruin theory ==
One area where Volterra integral equations appear is in ruin theory, the study of the risk of insolvency in actuarial science. The objective is to quantify the probability of ruin $\psi(u) = \mathbb{P}[\tau(u) < \infty]$, where $u$ is the initial surplus and $\tau(u)$ is the time of ruin. In the classical model of ruin theory, the net cash position $X_{t}$ is a function of the initial surplus, premium income earned at rate $c$, and outgoing claims $\xi$:
$$X_{t} = u + ct - \sum_{i=1}^{N_{t}}\xi_{i}, \quad t \geq 0$$
where $N_{t}$ is a Poisson process for the number of claims with intensity $\lambda$. Under these circumstances, the ruin probability may be represented by a Volterra integral equation of the form:
$$\psi(u) = {\lambda\over{c}}\int_{u}^{\infty}S(x)dx + {\lambda\over{c}}\int_{0}^{u}\psi(u-x)S(x)dx$$
where $S(\cdot)$ is the survival function of the claims distribution.

== Stochastic Volterra Equation ==
We say that the process $X_t$ is solution to a stochastic Volterra equation if $X_t = X_0 + \int_0^t K(t-s)b(x_s)ds + \int_0^t K(t-s) \sigma(X_s)dW_s$

where we assume $X_t$ to be adapted to the filtration of a probability space with the usual conditions. One model using this framework is for example the Rough Bergomi Model.

== See also ==
- Fredholm integral equation
- Integral equation
- Integro-differential equation
