= Fredholm (crater) =

Crater on the Moon

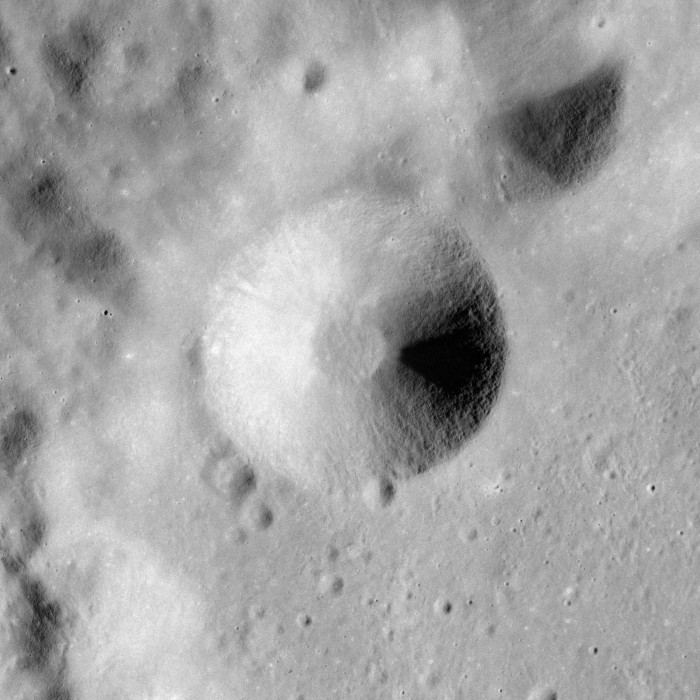
- Apollo 17 image
- Coordinates: 18.4°N 46.5°E
- Diameter: 13.39 km (8.32 mi)
- Depth: 2.5 km (1.6 mi)
- Colongitude: 314° at sunrise
- Eponym: Erik I. Fredholm

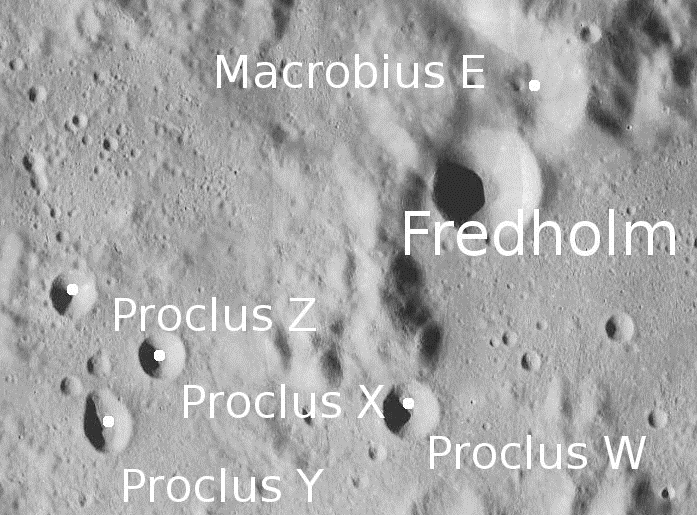
Surroundings of Fredholm crater

Fredholm is a small lunar impact crater that is located in the rugged highlands to the west of the Mare Crisium and east of Sinus Amoris. It lies midway between the prominent craters Macrobius to the north and Proclus almost due south.

This is a circular, symmetrical formation with a bowl-shaped interior. The inner walls gradually slope down towards the small, central floor, which is less than one quarter the total diameter of the crater. Neatly attached to the northern rim is the smaller Macrobius E.

This formation is named after Swedish mathematician Erik Ivar Fredholm (1866-1927). Its designation was officially adopted in 1976 by the International Astronomical Union. Previously, it was designated Macrobius D.
