= Resolvent formalism =

Technique in mathematics

In mathematics, the resolvent formalism is a technique for applying concepts from complex analysis to the study of the spectrum of operators on Banach spaces and more general spaces. Formal justification for the manipulations can be found in the framework of holomorphic functional calculus.

The resolvent captures the spectral properties of an operator in the analytic structure of the functional. Given an operator A, the resolvent may be defined as

$$R(z;A)= (A-zI)^{-1}~.$$

Among other uses, the resolvent may be used to solve the inhomogeneous Fredholm integral equations; a commonly used approach is a series solution, the Liouville–Neumann series.

The resolvent of A can be used to directly obtain information about the spectral decomposition of A. For example, suppose λ is an isolated eigenvalue in the spectrum of A. That is, suppose there exists a simple closed curve $C_\lambda$ in the complex plane that separates λ from the rest of the spectrum of A. Then the residue

$$-\frac{1}{2\pi i} \oint_{C_\lambda} (A- z I)^{-1}~ dz$$

defines a projection operator onto the λ eigenspace of A. The Hille–Yosida theorem relates the resolvent through a Laplace transform to an integral over the one-parameter group of transformations generated by A. Thus, for example, if A is a skew-Hermitian matrix, then U(t) = exp(tA) is a one-parameter group of unitary operators. Whenever $|z|>\|A\|$, the resolvent of A at z can be expressed as the Laplace transform

$$R(z;A)= \int_0^\infty e^{-zt}U(t)~dt,$$

where the integral is taken along the ray $\arg t=-\arg\lambda$.

== History ==
The first major use of the resolvent operator as a series in A (cf. Liouville–Neumann series) was by Ivar Fredholm, in a landmark 1903 paper in Acta Mathematica that helped establish modern operator theory.

The name resolvent was given by David Hilbert.

== Resolvent identity ==
For all z, w in ρ(A), the resolvent set of an operator A, we have that the first resolvent identity (also called Hilbert's identity) holds:

$$R(z; A) - R(w; A) = (z - w) R(z;A) R(w;A)\, .$$

(Note that Dunford and Schwartz, cited, define the resolvent as (zI −A)^{−1}, instead, so that the formula above differs in sign from theirs.)

The second resolvent identity is a generalization of the first resolvent identity, above, useful for comparing the resolvents of two distinct operators. Given operators A and B, both defined on the same linear space, and z in ρ(A) ∩ ρ(B) the following identity holds,

$$R(z;A) - R(z;B) = R(z;A)(B-A) R(z;B) \, .$$

A one-line proof goes as follows:

$$(A-zI)^{-1}-(B-zI)^{-1}=(A-zI)^{-1}((B-zI)-(A-zI))(B-zI)^{-1}=(A-zI)^{-1}(B-A)(B-zI)^{-1} \, .$$

== Compact resolvent ==
When studying a closed unbounded operator A: H → H on a Hilbert space H, if there exists $z\in\rho(A)$ such that $R(z;A)$ is a compact operator, we say that A has compact resolvent. The spectrum $\sigma(A)$ of such A is a discrete subset of $\mathbb{C}$. If furthermore A is self-adjoint, then $\sigma(A)\subset\mathbb{R}$ and there exists an orthonormal basis $\{v_i\}_{i\in\mathbb{N}}$ of eigenvectors of A with eigenvalues $\{\lambda_i\}_{i\in\mathbb{N}}$ respectively. Also, $\{\lambda_i\}$ has no finite accumulation point.

== See also ==
- Resolvent set
- Stone's theorem on one-parameter unitary groups
- Holomorphic functional calculus
- Spectral theory
- Compact operator
- Laplace transform
- Fredholm theory
- Liouville–Neumann series
- Decomposition of spectrum (functional analysis)
- Limiting absorption principle
