= Fredholm determinant =

Complex-valued function

In mathematics, the Fredholm determinant is a complex-valued function which generalizes the determinant of a finite dimensional linear operator. It is defined for bounded operators on a Hilbert space which differ from the identity operator by a trace-class operator (i.e. an operator whose singular values sum up to a finite number). The function is named after the mathematician Erik Ivar Fredholm.

Fredholm determinants have had many applications in mathematical physics, the most celebrated example being Gábor Szegő's limit formula, proved in response to a question raised by Lars Onsager and C. N. Yang on the spontaneous magnetization of the Ising model.

== Definition ==
=== Setup ===
Let $H$ be a Hilbert space and $G$ the set of bounded invertible operators on $H$ of the form $I+T$, where $T$ is a trace-class operator. $G$ is a group because

- The set of trace-class operators is an ideal in the algebra of bounded linear operators, so $(I+T)(I+T')-I = T + T' + TT'$ is trace-class.
- $(I+T)^{-1} - I = - T(I+T)^{-1},$ so $(I+T)^{-1}-I$ is trace class if $T$ is.

$G$ has a natural metric given by $d(X,Y)=\|X-Y\|_1$, where $\|X\|_1 = \sum_i |\lambda_i(X)|$ is the trace-class norm.

=== Definition by exponential trace ===
One definition uses the exponential trace formula. For finite-dimensional matrices, we have $\det (I+A) = e^{\operatorname{Tr}(\ln (I+A))}$, which expands in Taylor series to
$$\operatorname{det}(I+A)=\exp \left(\sum_{n=1}^{\infty} \frac{(-1)^{n+1}}{n} \operatorname{Tr}\left(A^n\right)\right)$$
This then generalizes directly to trace-class operators.

=== Definition by exterior powers ===
The exterior product of up to 3 vectors.

In the finite-dimensional case, the determinant of an operator can be interpreted as the factor by which it scales the (oriented) volume of a parallelepiped. This can be generalized to infinite dimensions.

In finite dimensions, by expanding the definition of determinant as a sum over permutations,
$$\det (I+ A) = \sum_{S} \det(A_{SS})$$
where $S$ ranges over all subsets of the index set of $A$. For example, when the index set is $\{1,2\}$ then $S = \{\}, \{1\}, \{2\}, \{1,2\}$.

If $H$ is an $n$-dimensional Hilbert space with inner product $(\cdot, \cdot)$, then the $k$-th exterior power $\Lambda^k H$ is also a $\binom{n}{k}$-dimensional Hilbert space, with inner product
$$(v_1 \wedge v_2 \wedge \cdots \wedge v_k, w_1 \wedge w_2 \wedge \cdots \wedge w_k) = \det (v_i,w_j).$$
In particular
$$e_{i_1} \wedge e_{i_2} \wedge \cdots \wedge e_{i_k}, \qquad (i_1<i_2<\cdots<i_k)$$
gives an orthonormal basis of $\Lambda^k H$ if $(e_i)$ is an orthonormal basis of $H$.

If $A$ is an operator on $H$, then $A$ functorially defines a bounded operator $\Lambda^k(A)$ on $\Lambda^k H$ by
$$\Lambda^k(A) v_1 \wedge v_2 \wedge \cdots \wedge v_k = Av_1 \wedge Av_2 \wedge \cdots \wedge Av_k.$$
By definition of trace, we have
$$\operatorname{Tr}\left(\Lambda^k A\right) =
\sum_{1 \leq i_1<\cdots<i_k \leq n} (e_{i_1} \wedge e_{i_2} \wedge \cdots \wedge e_{i_k},
Ae_{i_1} \wedge Ae_{i_2} \wedge \cdots \wedge Ae_{i_k})$$
The summand simplifies to $\det[(e_{i_j}, A e_{i_{j'}})] = \det(A_{SS})$ where $S = \{i_1, \dots, i_k\}$. Thus
$$\begin{aligned}
&\operatorname{Tr} \Lambda^k(A)=\sum_{|S|=k} \operatorname{det}\left(A_{S S}\right) .\\
&\operatorname{det}(I+A)=\sum_{k=0}^n \operatorname{Tr} \Lambda^k(A) .
\end{aligned}$$
This generalizes to infinite-dimensional Hilbert spaces, and bounded trace-class operators, allowing us to define the Fredholm determinant by
$$\det (I+ A) = \sum_{k=0}^\infty \operatorname{Tr} \Lambda^k(A)$$
To show that the definition makes sense, note that if $A$ is trace-class, then $\Lambda^k(A)$ is also trace-class with $\|\Lambda^k(A)\|_1 \le \|A\|_1^k/k!$, thus $\sum_{k=0}^\infty |\operatorname{Tr} \Lambda^k(A) | \leq e^{\|A\|_1}$.

Proof
Proof

We have $\|A\|_1=\sum_i \sigma_i$ where $\sigma_i$ are the singular values of $A$.

The singular values of $\Lambda^k(A)$ are exactly the products of $k$ distinct singular values of $A$. In other words, if you list all $k$-tuples with $1 \leq i_1<i_2<\cdots<i_k$, then the corresponding singular value of $\Lambda^k(A)$ is $\sigma_{i_1} \sigma_{i_2} \cdots \sigma_{i_k}$

Thus,

$$\left\|\Lambda^k(A)\right\|_1=\sum_{1 \leq i_1<i_2<\cdots<i_k} \sigma_{i_1} \sigma_{i_2} \cdots \sigma_{i_k}$$

This is the $k$ th elementary symmetric function of the singular values of $A$. Let $a_i \geq 0$ (in our case $a_i=\sigma_i$ ) then by expanding the right side, we have

$$\sum_{1 \leq i_1<\cdots<i_k} a_{i_1} \cdots a_{i_k} \leq \frac{1}{k!}\left(\sum_i a_i\right)^k$$

== Properties ==
By default, all operators are assumed trace-class.

- $\det(I+A) \cdot \det(I+B) = \det(I+A)(I+B).$
- $z \mapsto \det (I+ zA) = \sum_{k=0}^\infty z^k\operatorname{Tr} \Lambda^k(A)$ defines an entire function, with $\left|\det (I+ zA)\right| \le \exp (|z|\cdot \|A\|_1).$
- The function $A \mapsto \det(I+A)$ is continuous on trace-class operators, with

$$\left|\det(I+A) - \det(I+B)\right| \le \|A-B\|_1 \exp (\|A\|_1 + \|B\|_1 +1).$$
One can improve this inequality slightly to the following, as noted in (Simon 2005, Chapter 5):
$$\left|\det(I+A) -\det(I+B)\right| \le \|A-B\|_1 \exp (\max(\|A\|_1,\|B\|_1) +1).$$

- The function $\det$ defines a homomorphism of type $G \to \mathbb{C}^\times$ where $\mathbb C^\times$ the multiplicative group of nonzero complex numbers (since elements of $G$ are invertible).
- If $T$ is in $G$ and $X$ is invertible, $\det XTX^{-1} = \det T.$
- $\det e^A = \exp \, \operatorname{Tr} (A).$
- $\log \det (I+ zA) = \operatorname{Tr} (\log{(I+zA)}) = \sum_{k=1}^\infty (-1)^{k+1}\frac{\operatorname{Tr} A^k}{k}z^k$

== Integral operators ==
The Fredholm determinant is often applied to integral operators. Let the trace-class operator $T$ be an integral operator given by a kernel $K(x,y)$, then the Fredholm determinant is defined, like before, by
$$\det(I-\lambda T)
= \sum_{n=0}^\infty (-\lambda)^n \operatorname{Tr } \Lambda^n(T)
= \exp{\left(-\sum_{n=1}^\infty\frac{\operatorname{Tr}(T^n)}{n}\lambda^n\right)}$$
where $T$ is an integral operator. The trace of the operator $T$ and its alternating powers is given in terms of the kernel $K$ by
$$\operatorname{Tr } T = \int K(x,x)\,dx$$
and
$$\operatorname{Tr }\Lambda^2(T) = \frac{1}{2!}  \iint \left(K(x,x)K(y,y)-K(x,y) K(y,x)\right)dx \, dy$$
and in general
$$\operatorname{Tr } \Lambda^n(T) = \frac{1}{n!}\int\cdots\int \det [K(x_i,x_j)]_{i, j \in 1:n}\,dx_{1:n}$$
The trace is well-defined for these kernels, since these are trace-class or nuclear operators.

To see that this is a special case of the previous section's general definition, note that,
$$\operatorname{Tr}\left(\Lambda^k A\right) =
\sum_{1 \leq i_1<\cdots<i_k \leq n} (e_{i_1} \wedge e_{i_2} \wedge \cdots \wedge e_{i_k},
Ae_{i_1} \wedge Ae_{i_2} \wedge \cdots \wedge Ae_{i_k})$$
is equivalent to
$$\frac{1}{k!}\sum_{i_1, \cdots, i_k \in 1:n, \text{ all different}} \det(A_{SS})$$
where $S$ is the ordered sequence $i_1, \dots, i_k$. Now, to convert this to integral equations, a matrix becomes a kernel, and a summation over indices becomes an integral over coordinates.

The above argument is intuitive. A proper definition requires a presentation showing that each of the manipulations are well-defined, convergent, and so on, for the given situation for which the Fredholm determinant is contemplated. Since the kernel $K$ may be defined for a large variety of Hilbert spaces and Banach spaces, this is a non-trivial exercise.

=== Integral equation ===
The original (Fredholm 1903) considered the integral equation
$$u(x)+z \int_a^b K(x, y) u(y) d y=f(x) \quad(x \in(a, b))$$
which can be written as $(I + zA) u = f$. Fredholm proved that this equation has a unique solution if $\det(I + zA) \neq 0$.

== Commutators ==
A function $F(t)$ from $(a,b)$ into $G$ is said to be differentiable if $F(t)-I$ is differentiable as a map into the trace-class operators, i.e. if the limit

$$\dot{F}(t) = \lim_{h \to 0} {F(t+h) - F(t)\over h}$$

exists in trace-class norm.

If $g(t)$ is a differentiable function with values in trace-class operators, then so too is $F(t)=\exp g(t)$ and

$$F^{-1} \dot{F} = {\operatorname{id} -  \exp( - \operatorname{ad} g(t))\over \operatorname{ad} g(t)} \cdot \dot{g}(t),$$

where
$$\operatorname{ad}(X)\cdot Y = XY -YX.$$

Israel Gohberg and Mark Krein proved that if $F$ is a differentiable function into $G$, then $f=\det F$ is a differentiable map into $\mathbb{C}^*$ with
$$f^{-1} \dot{f} = \operatorname{Tr} F^{-1} \dot{F}.$$

This result was used by Joel Pincus, William Helton and Roger Howe to prove that if $A$ and $B$ are bounded operators with trace-class commutator $AB-BA$, then

$$\det e^A e^B e^{-A} e^{-B} = \exp \operatorname{Tr} (AB-BA).$$

== Szegő limit formula ==
Let $H=L^2(S^1)$ and let $P$ be the orthogonal projection onto the Hardy space $H^2(S^1)$.

If $f$ is a smooth function on the circle, let $m(f)$ denote the corresponding multiplication operator on $H$.

The commutator
$$Pm(f)-m(f)P$$
is trace-class.

Let $T(f)$ be the Toeplitz operator on $H^2(S^1)$ defined by
$$T(f) = Pm(f)P,$$

then the additive commutator
$$T(f) T(g) - T(g) T(f)$$
is trace-class if $f$ and $g$ are smooth.

Berger and Shaw proved that
$$\operatorname{tr}(T(f) T(g) - T(g) T(f)) =  {1\over 2\pi i} \int_0^{2\pi} f \, dg.$$

If $f$ and $g$ are smooth, then
$$T(e^{f+g})T(e^{-f}) T(e^{-g})$$
is in $G$.

Harold Widom used the result of Pincus-Helton-Howe to prove that
$$\det T(e^f) T(e^{-f}) = \exp \sum_{ n>0} na_n a_{-n},$$
where
$$f(z) =\sum a_n z^n.$$

He used this to give a new proof of Gábor Szegő's celebrated limit formula:
$$\lim_{N\to \infty} \det P_N m(e^f) P_N = \exp \sum_{ n>0} na_n a_{-n},$$
where $P_N$ is the projection onto the subspace of $H$ spanned by $1,z,\ldots,z^N$ and $a_0=0$.

Szegő's limit formula was proved in 1951 in response to a question raised by the work Lars Onsager and C. N. Yang on the calculation of the spontaneous magnetization for the Ising model. The formula of Widom, which leads quite quickly to Szegő's limit formula, is also equivalent to the duality between bosons and fermions in conformal field theory. A singular version of Szegő's limit formula for functions supported on an arc of the circle was proved by Widom; it has been applied to establish probabilistic results on the eigenvalue distribution of random unitary matrices.

== History ==
The Fredholm determinant was first used in (Fredholm 1903) to solve an integral equation. Realizing the potential, Hilbert wrote 6 papers during 1904 to 1910 (collected in (Hilbert 1924)), beginning the theory of compact operators on Hilbert spaces. See (Bornemann 2010) and references therein.

The Fredholm determinant was used by physicist John A. Wheeler (1937, Phys. Rev. 52:1107) to help provide mathematical description of the wavefunction for a composite nucleus composed of antisymmetrized combination of partial wavefunctions by the method of Resonating Group Structure. This method corresponds to the various possible ways of distributing the energy of neutrons and protons into fundamental boson and fermion nucleon cluster groups or building blocks such as the alpha-particle, helium-3, deuterium, triton, di-neutron, etc. When applied to the method of Resonating Group Structure for beta and alpha stable isotopes, use of the Fredholm determinant: (1) determines the energy values of the composite system, and (2) determines scattering and disintegration cross sections. The method of Resonating Group Structure of Wheeler provides the theoretical bases for all subsequent Nucleon Cluster Models and associated cluster energy dynamics for all light and heavy mass isotopes (see review of Cluster Models in physics in N.D. Cook, 2006).
