= Hilbert–Schmidt integral operator =

Type o integral transform in mathematics

In mathematics, a Hilbert–Schmidt integral operator is a type of integral transform. Specifically, given a domain Ω in R^{n}, any k : Ω × Ω → C such that

$$\int_{\Omega} \int_{\Omega} | k(x, y) |^{2} \,dx \, dy < \infty ,$$

is called a Hilbert–Schmidt kernel. The associated integral operator T : L^{2}(Ω) → L^{2}(Ω) given by

$$(Tf) (x) = \int_{\Omega} k(x, y) f(y) \, dy$$

is called a Hilbert–Schmidt integral operator. T is a Hilbert–Schmidt operator with Hilbert–Schmidt norm

$$\Vert T \Vert_\mathrm{HS} = \Vert k \Vert_{L^2}.$$

Hilbert–Schmidt integral operators are both continuous and compact.

The concept of a Hilbert–Schmidt integral operator may be extended to any locally compact Hausdorff space X equipped with a positive Borel measure. If L^{2}(X) is separable, and k belongs to L^{2}(X × X), then the operator T : L^{2}(X) → L^{2}(X) defined by

$$(Tf)(x) = \int_{X} k(x,y)f(y)\,dy$$

is compact. If

$$k(x,y) = \overline{k(y,x)},$$

then T is also self-adjoint and so the spectral theorem applies. This is one of the fundamental constructions of such operators, which often reduces problems about infinite-dimensional vector spaces to questions about well-understood finite-dimensional eigenspaces.

== See also ==
- Hilbert–Schmidt operator
