= Fredholm operator =

Part of Fredholm theories in integral equations

In mathematics, Fredholm operators are certain operators that arise in the Fredholm theory of integral equations. They are named in honor of Erik Ivar Fredholm. By definition, a Fredholm operator is a bounded linear operator T : X

→ Y between two Banach spaces with finite-dimensional kernel $\ker T$ and finite-dimensional (algebraic) cokernel $\operatorname{coker}T = Y/\operatorname{ran}T$, and with closed range $\operatorname{ran}T$. The last condition is actually redundant.

The index of a Fredholm operator is the integer

$$\operatorname{ind}T := \dim \ker T - \operatorname{codim}\operatorname{ran}T$$

alternatively,

$$\operatorname{ind}T := \dim \ker T - \operatorname{dim}\operatorname{coker}T.$$

== Properties ==
Intuitively, Fredholm operators are those operators that are invertible "if finite-dimensional effects are ignored." The formally correct statement follows. A bounded operator $T: X \to Y$ between Banach spaces $X$ and $Y$ is Fredholm if and only if it is invertible modulo compact operators, i.e., if there exists a bounded linear operator

$$S: Y\to X$$

such that

$$\mathrm{Id}_X - ST \quad\text{and}\quad \mathrm{Id}_Y - TS$$

are compact operators on $X$ and $Y$ respectively.

If a Fredholm operator is modified slightly, it stays Fredholm and its index remains the same. Formally: The set of Fredholm operators from $X$ to $Y$ is open in the Banach space $L(X,Y)$ of bounded linear operators, equipped with the operator norm, and the index is locally constant. More precisely, if $T_0$ is Fredholm from $X$ to $Y$, there exists $\varepsilon > 0$ such that every $T$ in $L(X,Y)$ with $||T - T_0|| < \varepsilon$ is Fredholm, with the same index as that of $T_0$

When $T$ is Fredholm from $X$ to $Y$ and $U$ Fredholm from $Y$ to $Z$, then the composition $U \circ T$ is Fredholm from $X$ to $Z$ and

$$\operatorname{ind} (U \circ T) = \operatorname{ind}(U) + \operatorname{ind}(T).$$

When $T$ is Fredholm, the transpose (or adjoint) operator $T'$ is Fredholm from $Y'$ to $X'$, and $\text{ind}(T') = -\text{ind}(T)$. When $X$ and $Y$ are Hilbert spaces, the same conclusion holds for the Hermitian adjoint $T^*$.

When $T$ is Fredholm and $K$ a compact operator, then $T+K$ is Fredholm. The index of $T$ remains unchanged under such a compact perturbation of $T$. This follows from the fact that the index $\text{ind}(T+sK)$ is an integer defined for every $s$ in $[0,1]$, and $\text{ind}(T+sK)$ is locally constant, hence $\text{ind}(T) = \text{ind}(T+sK)$.

Invariance by perturbation is true for larger classes than the class of compact operators. For example, when $U$ is Fredholm and $T$ a strictly singular operator, then $T + U$ is Fredholm with the same index. The class of inessential operators, which properly contains the class of strictly singular operators, is the "perturbation class" for Fredholm operators. This means an operator $T\in B(X,Y)$ is inessential if and only if $T+U$ is Fredholm for every Fredholm operator $U\in B(X,Y)$.

== Examples ==
Let $X$ and $Y$ be Hilbert spaces. If $T : X \to Y$ is Fredholm, then we have a decomposition:
$$X = \ker T \oplus (\ker T)^\perp, \quad Y = \operatorname{ran} T \oplus (\operatorname{ran} T)^\perp$$
$T$ is a bicontinuous bijection between $(\ker T)^\perp, \operatorname{ran} T$, and for it to be Fredholm, both $\ker T , (\operatorname{ran} T)^\perp$ must be finite-dimensional. By picking an appropriate orthonormal basis, $T$ has a matrix representation
$$\begin{bmatrix}
0_{ \operatorname{dim}\operatorname{coker}T \times \dim \ker T} & 0\\ 0 & \ddots
\end{bmatrix}$$.

Let $H$ be a Hilbert space with an orthonormal basis $\{e_n\}$ indexed by the non negative integers. The unilateral shift operator S on H is defined by

$$S(e_n) = e_{n+1}, \quad n \ge 0. \,$$

This operator S is injective (actually, isometric) and has a closed range of codimension 1, hence S is Fredholm with $\operatorname{ind}(S)=-1$. The powers $S^k$, $k\geq0$, are Fredholm with index $-k$. The adjoint S* is the left shift,

$$S^*(e_0) = 0, \ \ S^*(e_n) = e_{n-1}, \quad n \ge 1. \,$$

The left shift S* is Fredholm with index 1.

If H is the classical Hardy space $H^2(\mathbf{T})$ on the unit circle T in the complex plane, then the shift operator with respect to the orthonormal basis of complex exponentials

$$e_n : \mathrm{e}^{\mathrm{i} t} \in \mathbf{T} \mapsto
\mathrm{e}^{\mathrm{i} n t}, \quad n \ge 0, \,$$

is the multiplication operator M_{φ} with the function $\varphi=e_1$. More generally, let φ be a complex continuous function on T that does not vanish on $\mathbf{T}$, and let T_{φ} denote the Toeplitz operator with symbol φ, equal to multiplication by φ followed by the orthogonal projection $P:L^2(\mathbf{T})\to H^2(\mathbf{T})$:

$$T_\varphi : f \in H^2(\mathrm{T}) \mapsto P(f \varphi) \in H^2(\mathrm{T}). \,$$

Then T_{φ} is a Fredholm operator on $H^2(\mathbf{T})$, with index related to the winding number around 0 of the closed path $t\in[0,2\pi]\mapsto \varphi(e^{it})$: the index of T_{φ}, as defined in this article, is the opposite of this winding number.

== Applications ==
Any elliptic operator on a closed manifold can be extended to a Fredholm operator. The use of Fredholm operators in partial differential equations is an abstract form of the parametrix method.

The Atiyah-Singer index theorem gives a topological characterization of the index of certain operators on manifolds.

The Atiyah-Jänich theorem identifies the K-theory K(X) of a compact topological space X with the set of homotopy classes of continuous maps from X to the space of Fredholm operators H→H, where H is the separable Hilbert space and the set of these operators carries the operator norm.

== Generalizations ==
=== Semi-Fredholm operators ===
A bounded linear operator T is called semi-Fredholm if its range is closed and at least one of $\ker T$, $\operatorname{coker}T$ is finite-dimensional. For a semi-Fredholm operator, the index is defined by

$$\operatorname{ind}T=\begin{cases}
+\infty,&\dim\ker T=\infty;
\\
\dim\ker T-\dim\operatorname{coker}T,&\dim\ker T+\dim\operatorname{coker}T<\infty;
\\
-\infty,&\dim\operatorname{coker}T=\infty.
\end{cases}$$

=== Unbounded operators ===
One may also define unbounded Fredholm operators. Let X and Y be two Banach spaces.

1. The closed linear operator $T:\,X\to Y$ is called Fredholm if its domain $\mathfrak{D}(T)$ is dense in $X$, its range is closed, and both kernel and cokernel of T are finite-dimensional.
2. $T:\,X\to Y$ is called semi-Fredholm if its domain $\mathfrak{D}(T)$ is dense in $X$, its range is closed, and either kernel or cokernel of T (or both) is finite-dimensional.

As it was noted above, the range of a closed operator is closed as long as the cokernel is finite-dimensional (Edmunds and Evans, Theorem I.3.2).
