= Compact operator on Hilbert space =

Functional analysis concept

In the mathematical discipline of functional analysis, the concept of a compact operator on Hilbert space is an extension of the concept of a matrix acting on a finite-dimensional vector space; in Hilbert space, compact operators are precisely the closure of finite-rank operators (representable by finite-dimensional matrices) in the topology induced by the operator norm. As such, results from matrix theory can sometimes be extended to compact operators using similar arguments. By contrast, the study of general operators on infinite-dimensional spaces often requires a genuinely different approach.

For example, the spectral theory of compact operators on Banach spaces takes a form that is very similar to the Jordan canonical form of matrices. In the context of Hilbert spaces, a square matrix is unitarily diagonalizable if and only if it is normal. A corresponding result holds for normal compact operators on Hilbert spaces. More generally, the compactness assumption can be dropped. As stated above, the techniques used to prove results, e.g., the spectral theorem, in the non-compact case are typically different, involving operator-valued measures on the spectrum.

The quotient $C^\ast$-algebra of $L(H)$ modulo the compact operators is called the Calkin algebra, in which one can consider properties of an operator up to compact perturbation.

== Definition ==
Let $H$ be a Hilbert space and $L(H)$ be the set of bounded operators on $H$. Then, an operator $T\in L(H)$ is said to be a compact operator if the image of each bounded set under $T$ is relatively compact.

== Some general properties ==
- If $X$ and $Y$ are separable Hilbert spaces (in fact, $X$ Banach and $Y$ normed will suffice), then $T:X\to Y$ is compact if and only if it is sequentially continuous when viewed as a map from $X$ with the weak topology to $Y$ (with the norm topology). (Note: See Zhu (2007, Theorem 1.14, p.11) and note in this reference that the uniform boundedness will apply in the situation where $F\subset X$ satisfies $\forall \varphi\in Hom(X,K), \sup_F \phi(x)/x <\infty$, where $K$ is the underlying field. The uniform boundedness principle applies since $\mathrm{Hom}(X,K)$ with the norm topology will be a Banach space, and the maps $x^{\ast\ast}:\mathrm{Hom}(X,K)\to K$ are continuous homomorphisms with respect to this topology.))
- The family of compact operators is a norm-closed, two-sided, *-ideal in $L(H)$. Consequently, if $H$ is infinite-dimensional, then the inverse of a compact invertible operator $T$ cannot be bounded (otherwise, the identity operator would be compact, which is the case if and only if $H$ is finite-dimensional.)
- If $T$ is compact, and $(B_n)_{n\in\N},(C_n)_{n\in\N}$ are two sequences of bounded operators converging for the strong operator topology to B and C respectively, then $B_nTC_n^*$ converges to $BTC^*$ in norm. For example, consider the Hilbert space $\ell^2(\mathbf{N}),$ with standard basis $(e_n)_{n\in N}$. Let $P_m$ be the orthogonal projection on the linear span of $(e_1,\dots,e_m)$. The sequence $P_m$ converges to the identity operator $\mathrm{I}$ strongly but not uniformly. Define $T$ by $Te_n = \tfrac{1}{n^2} e_n.$ $T$ is compact, and, as claimed above, $P_mT\to IT=T$ in the uniform operator topology: for all $x$,

$$\left\| P_m T x - T x \right \| \leq \left( \frac{1}{m+1}\right)^2 \| x \|.$$
Notice each $P_m$ is a finite-rank operator.

- A bounded operator $T$ is compact if and only if it is the uniform limit of some sequence of finite-rank operators.

== Compact self-adjoint operators ==
=== Spectral theorem ===
A bounded operator $T$ on a Hilbert space $H$ is said to be self-adjoint if $T=T^\ast$, or equivalently,
$$\forall x,y\in H,\quad\langle T x, y \rangle = \langle x, T y \rangle.$$
The spectral theorem for (finite-dimensional) self-adjoint matrices generalizes to compact self-adjoint operators on real or complex Hilbert spaces, namely such an operator can be diagonalized by an orthonormal set of eigenvectors, each of which corresponding to a real eigenvalue. More precisely, the orthogonal complement of the kernel of $T$ admits an orthonormal basis $(e_n)$ of cardinal at most countable consisting of eigenvectors of $T$ with corresponding eigenvalues $\lambda_n\in \R$, such that $\lambda_n\to 0$. When the Hilbert space is in addition separable, one can mix the basis $(e_n)$ with a countable orthonormal basis for the kernel of $T$, and obtain a countable orthonormal basis $(f_n)$ for the total space, consisting of eigenvectors of $T$ with real eigenvalues $\mu_n$ such that $\mu_n\to 0$.

As in finite dimension, the spectral theorems is shown by using induction together with the existence of one eigenvector $x$ of $T$. In finite dimension, the existence of an eigenvector can be shown in (at least) two alternative ways:

1. One can argue algebraically: The characteristic polynomial of $T$ has a complex root, therefore $T$ has an eigenvalue with a corresponding eigenvector.
2. The eigenvalues can be characterized variationally: The largest eigenvalue is the maximum on the closed unit sphere of the function $f:\R^{2n}\to \R$ defined by $f(x)=x^\ast Tx=\langle Tx,x\rangle$.

In infinite dimension, the existence of an eigenvector for every compact self-adjoint operator can be obtained by extending the second finite-dimensional argument above. In this argument, one has to replace the compactness of the unit ball by an argument involving the compactness of the operator.

More precisely, setting
$$m(T) := \sup \bigl\{ |\langle T x, x \rangle| : x \in H, \, \|x\| \le 1 \bigr\},$$
it can be shown first that $m(T)$ is in fact a maximum and then that either $m(T)$ or $-m(T)$ is an eigenvalue of $T$.

Proof

If ($m(T)=0$, then $T=0$ by the polarization identity, and this case is clear. Consider the function
$$\begin{cases} f : H \to \mathbf{R} \\ f(x) = \langle T x, x \rangle \end{cases}$$

Replacing $T$ by $-T$ if necessary, one may assume that the supremum of $f$ on the closed unit ball $B\subset H$ is equal to $m(T)>0$.

By the Banach–Alaoglu theorem and the reflexivity of $H$, the closed unit ball $B$ is weakly compact. Also, the compactness of $T$ means (see above) that $T$ seen as an operator from $H$ with the weak topology to $H$ with the norm topology is continuous. These two facts imply that $f$ is continuous on $B$ equipped with the weak topology, and $f$ therefore attains its maximum $m$ on $B$ at some $y\in B$.

We now show that $Ty=m(T)y$. This is equivalent to

$$\forall z\in H, \mathrm{Re}(\langle Ty-m(T)y,z\rangle=0$$

Now since y is the maximum of f, it is also the maximum of the Rayleigh quotient:
$$g(x) = \frac{\langle Tx, x \rangle}{\|x\|^2}, \qquad 0 \ne x \in H.$$
Therefore, the function
$$\begin{cases} h : \mathbf{R} \to \mathbf{R} \\ h(t) = g(y+tz) \end{cases}$$
achieves its maximum at 0, and thus h′(0) = 0. A computation now shows that
$$\begin{align}h'(0)&=\frac{1}{\|y\|^2} \left (\frac{d}{dt} \frac{\langle T (y + t z), y + tz \rangle}{\langle y + tz, y + tz \rangle} \right)(0)\\
&= \operatorname{Re}(\langle T y - m(Y) y, z \rangle)
\end{align}$$

Note. The compactness of $T$ is crucial. In general, $f$ need not be continuous for the weak topology on the unit ball $B$. For example, let $T$ be the identity operator, which is not compact when $H$ is infinite-dimensional. Take any orthonormal sequence $(y_n)_{n\in \N}$. Then $y_n$ converges to 0 weakly, but $\lim f(y_n)=1 \ne 0=f(0)$.

Induction argument (without the axiom of choice)

Let $T$ be a compact operator on a Hilbert space $H$. A finite (possibly empty) or countably infinite orthonormal sequence $(e_n)$ of eigenvectors of $T$, with corresponding non-zero eigenvalues, is constructed by induction as follows. Let $H_0=H$ and $T_0=T$. If $m(T_0)=0$, then $T=0$ and the construction stops without producing any eigenvector $e_n$. Suppose that orthonormal eigenvectors $e_0,\dots,e_{n-1}$ of $T$ have been found. Then $E_n:= \mathrm{Span}(e_0,\dots,e_{n-1})$ is invariant under $T$, and by self-adjointness, the orthogonal complement $H_n$ is an invariant subspace of $T$. Let $T_n$ denote the restriction of $T$ to $H_n$. If $m(T_n)=0$, then $T_n=0$, and the construction stops. Otherwise, applying to $T_n$ the property of existence of an eigenvector, there is a norm one eigenvector $e_n$ of $T$ in $H_n$, with corresponding non-zero eigenvalue $\lambda_n=m(T_n)$.

Let $F=\mathrm{Span}((e_n)_n)^\perp$, where $(e_n)_n$ is the finite or infinite sequence constructed by the inductive process; by self-adjointness, $F$ is invariant under $T$. Let $S$ denote the restriction of $T$ to $F$. If the process was stopped after finitely many steps, with the last vector $e_{m-1}$, then $F=H_m$ and $S=T_m=0$ by construction. In the infinite case, compactness of $T$ and the weak-convergence of $e_n$ to 0 imply that $Te_n=\lambda_ne_n \to 0$, therefore $\lambda_n\to 0$. Since $F$ is contained in $H_n$ for every $n$, it follows that $m(S)\le m(T_n)=\vert \lambda_n\vert$ for every $n$, hence $m(S)=0$. This implies again that $S=0$.

The fact that S = 0 means that F is contained in the kernel of $T$. Conversely, if x ∈ ker($T$) then by self-adjointness, x is orthogonal to every eigenvector {e_{n}} with non-zero eigenvalue. It follows that F = ker($T$), and that {e_{n}} is an orthonormal basis for the orthogonal complement of the kernel of $T$. One can complete the diagonalization of $T$ by selecting an orthonormal basis of the kernel. This proves the spectral theorem.

Induction argument (using the axiom of choice)

A shorter but more abstract proof goes as follows: by Zorn's lemma, select $U$ to be a maximal subset of $H$ with the following three properties: all elements of $U$ are eigenvectors of $T$, they have norm one, and any two distinct elements of $U$ are orthogonal. Let $F$ be the orthogonal complement of the linear span of $U$. If $F\ne \{0\}$, it is a non-trivial invariant subspace of $T$, and by the existence property of an eigenvector, there exists a norm one eigenvector $y$ of $T$ in $F$. But then $U\cup \{y\}$ contradicts the maximality of $U$. It follows that $F=\{0\}$, hence the linear span of $U$ is dense in $H$. This shows that $U$ is an orthonormal basis of $H$ consisting of eigenvectors of $T$.

=== Functional calculus ===
If $T$ is compact on an infinite-dimensional Hilbert space $H$, then $T$ is not invertible, hence $\sigma(T)$, the spectrum of $T$, always contains 0. The spectral theorem shows that $\sigma(T)$ consists of the eigenvalues $\lambda_n$ of $T$ and of 0 (if 0 is not already an eigenvalue). The set $\sigma(T)$ is a compact subset of the complex numbers, and the eigenvalues are dense in $\sigma(T)$.

Any spectral theorem can be reformulated in terms of a functional calculus. In the present context, we have:

Theorem. Let $C(\sigma(T))$ denote the C*-algebra of continuous functions on $\sigma(T)$. There exists a unique isometric homomorphism $\Phi:C(\sigma(T))\to L(H)$ such that $\Phi(1)=\mathrm{I}$ and, if $f$ is the identity function $f(\lambda)=\lambda$, then $\Phi(f)=T$. Now we may define $g(T):=\Phi(g)$ (clearly this would hold when $g$ is polynomial). Then it also holds, that $\sigma(g(T))=g(\sigma(T))$.

The functional calculus map $\Phi$ is defined in a natural way: let $(e_n)$ be an orthonormal basis of eigenvectors for $H$, with corresponding eigenvalues $\lambda_n$; for $f\in C(\sigma(T))$, the operator $\Phi(f)$, diagonal with respect to the orthonormal basis $e_n$, is defined by setting
$$\Phi(f)(e_n) = f(\lambda_n) e_n$$
for every $n$. Since $\Phi(f)$ is diagonal with respect to an orthonormal basis, its norm is equal to the supremum of the modulus of diagonal coefficients,
$$\|\Phi(f)\| = \sup_{\lambda_n \in \sigma(T)} |f(\lambda_n)| = \|f\|_{C(\sigma(T))}.$$

The other properties of $\Phi$ can be readily verified. For the unicity part, notice that any homomorphism $\Psi$ satisfying the requirements of the theorem must coincide with $\Phi$ when evaluated on a polynomial function. By the Weierstrass approximation theorem, polynomial functions are dense in $C(\sigma(T))$, and it follows that $\Psi=\Phi$. This shows that $\Phi$ is unique.

The more general continuous functional calculus can be defined for any self-adjoint (or even normal, in the complex case) bounded linear operator on a Hilbert space. The compact case described here is a particularly simple instance of this functional calculus.

=== Simultaneous diagonalization ===
Consider a Hilbert space $H$ (e.g. the finite-dimensional $\C^n$), and a commuting set $\mathcal{F}\subseteq\operatorname{Hom}(H,H)$ of self-adjoint operators. Then under suitable conditions, it can be simultaneously (unitarily) diagonalized. Viz., there exists an orthonormal basis $Q$ consisting of common eigenvectors for the operators — i.e.,
$$(\forall{q\in Q,T\in\mathcal{F}})(\exists{\sigma\in\mathbf{C}})(T-\sigma)q=0$$

Lemma—Suppose all the operators in $\mathcal{F}$ are compact. Then every closed non-zero $\mathcal{F}$-invariant sub-space $S\subseteq H$ has a common eigenvector for $\mathcal{F}$.

Proof

Case I: all the operators have each exactly one eigenvalue on $S$. Take any $s\in S$ of unit length. It is a common eigenvector.

Case II: there is some operator $T\in\mathcal{F}$ with at least 2 eigenvalues on $S$ and let $0 \neq \alpha \in \sigma(T\upharpoonright S)$. Since $T$ is compact and α is non-zero, we have $S' := \ker(T \upharpoonright S - \alpha)$ is a finite-dimensional (and therefore closed) non-zero $\mathcal{F}$-invariant sub-space (because the operators all commute with $T$, we have for $T'\in\mathcal{F}$ and $x\in\ker(T\upharpoonright S - \alpha)$, that $(T-\alpha)(T'x)=(T'(T~x)-\alpha T'x)=0$). In particular, since α is just one of the eigenvalues of $T$ on $S$, we definitely have $\dim S' < \dim S$. Thus we could in principle argue by induction over dimension, yielding that $S'\subseteq S$ has a common eigenvector for $\mathcal{F}$.

Theorem 1—If all the operators in $\mathcal{F}$ are compact then the operators can be simultaneously (unitarily) diagonalized.

Proof

The following set
$$\mathbf{P}=\{ A \subseteq H : A \text{ is an orthonormal set of common eigenvectors for } \mathcal{F}\},$$
is partially ordered by inclusion. This clearly has the Zorn property. So taking $Q$ a maximal member, if $Q$ is a basis for the whole Hilbert space $H$, we are done. If this were not the case, then letting $S=\langle Q\rangle^{\bot}$, it is easy to see that this would be an $\mathcal{F}$-invariant non-trivial closed subspace; and thus by the lemma above, therein would lie a common eigenvector for the operators (necessarily orthogonal to $Q$). But then there would then be a proper extension of $Q$ within $\mathbf{P}$; a contradiction to its maximality.

Theorem 2—If there is an injective compact operator in $\mathcal{F}$; then the operators can be simultaneously (unitarily) diagonalized.

Proof

Fix $T_0\in\mathcal{F}$ compact injective. Then we have, by the spectral theory of compact symmetric operators on Hilbert spaces:
$$H=\overline{\bigoplus_{\lambda\in\sigma(T_0)} \ker(T_0-\sigma)},$$
where $\sigma(T_0)$ is a discrete, countable subset of positive real numbers, and all the eigenspaces are finite-dimensional. Since $\mathcal{F}$ a commuting set, we have all the eigenspaces are invariant. Since the operators restricted to the eigenspaces (which are finite-dimensional) are automatically all compact, we can apply Theorem 1 to each of these, and find orthonormal bases Q_{σ} for the $\ker(T_0-\sigma)$. Since $T$_{0} is symmetric, we have that
$$Q:=\bigcup_{\sigma\in\sigma(T_0)} Q_{\sigma}$$
is a (countable) orthonormal set. It is also, by the decomposition we first stated, a basis for H.

Theorem 3—If $H$ a finite-dimensional Hilbert space, and $\mathcal{F}\subseteq\operatorname{Hom}(H,H)$ a commutative set of operators, each of which is diagonalisable; then the operators can be simultaneously diagonalized.

Proof

Case I: all operators have exactly one eigenvalue. Then any basis for $H$ will do.

Case II: Fix $T_0\in\mathcal{F}$ an operator with at least two eigenvalues, and let $P\in\operatorname{Hom}(H,H)^{\times}$ so that $P^{-1}T_0P$ is a symmetric operator. Now let α be an eigenvalue of $P^{-1}T_0P$. Then it is easy to see that both:
$$\ker\left(P^{-1}~T_0(P-\alpha)\right), \quad \ker\left(P^{-1}~T_0(P-\alpha) \right)^{\bot}$$
are non-trivial $P^{-1}\mathcal{F}P$-invariant subspaces. By induction over dimension we have that there are linearly independent bases Q_{1}, Q_{2} for the subspaces, which demonstrate that the operators in $P^{-1}\mathcal{F}P$ can be simultaneously diagonalisable on the subspaces. Clearly then $P(Q_1\cup Q_2)$ demonstrates that the operators in $\mathcal{F}$ can be simultaneously diagonalised.

Notice we did not have to directly use the machinery of matrices at all in this proof. There are other versions which do.

We can strengthen the above to the case where all the operators merely commute with their adjoint; in this case we remove the term "orthogonal" from the diagonalisation. There are weaker results for operators arising from representations due to Weyl–Peter. Let $G$ be a fixed locally compact hausdorff group, and $H=L^2(G)$ (the space of square integrable measurable functions with respect to the unique-up-to-scale Haar measure on G). Consider the continuous shift action:
$$\begin{cases} G\times H\to H \\ (gf)(x)=f(g^{-1}x) \end{cases}$$

Then if G were compact then there is a unique decomposition of $H$ into a countable direct sum of finite-dimensional, irreducible, invariant subspaces (this is essentially diagonalisation of the family of operators $G\subseteq U(H)$). If $G$ were not compact, but were abelian, then diagonalisation is not achieved, but we get a unique continuous decomposition of $H$ into 1-dimensional invariant subspaces.

== Compact normal operator ==
The family of Hermitian matrices is a proper subset of matrices that are unitarily diagonalizable. A matrix $M$ is unitarily diagonalizable if and only if it is normal, i.e., $M^\ast M=MM^\ast$. Similar statements hold for compact normal operators.

Let $T$ be compact and $T^\ast T=TT^\ast$. Apply the Cartesian decomposition to $T$: define
$$R = \frac{T + T^*}{2}, \quad J = \frac{T - T^*}{2i}.$$

The self-adjoint compact operators $R$ and $J$ are called the real and imaginary parts of $T$, respectively. That $T$ is compact implies that $T^\ast$ and, consequently, $R$ and $J$ are compact. Furthermore, the normality of $T$ implies that $R$ and $J$ commute. Therefore they can be simultaneously diagonalized, from which follows the claim.

A hyponormal compact operator (in particular, a subnormal operator) is normal.

== Unitary operator ==
The spectrum of a unitary operator $U$ lies on the unit circle in the complex plane; it could be the entire unit circle. However, if $U$ is identity plus a compact perturbation, $U$ has only a countable spectrum, containing 1 and possibly, a finite set or a sequence tending to 1 on the unit circle. More precisely, suppose $U=I+C$ where $C$ is compact. The equations $UU^\ast=U^\ast U = I$ and $C=U-I$ show that $C$ is normal. The spectrum of $C$ contains 0, and possibly, a finite set or a sequence tending to 0. Since U = I + C, the spectrum of $U$ is obtained by shifting the spectrum of $C$ by 1.

== Examples ==
- Let H = L^{2}([0, 1]). The multiplication operator M defined by
  $$(M f)(x) = x f(x), \quad f \in H, \, \, x \in [0, 1]$$
  is a bounded self-adjoint operator on H that has no eigenvector and hence, by the spectral theorem, cannot be compact.
- An example of a compact operator on a Hilbert space that is not self-adjoint is the Volterra operator, defined for a function $f\in L^2([0,1])$ and a value $t \in [0,1]$ as
  $$V(f)(t) = \int_{0}^{t} f(s)\, ds.$$
  It is the operator corresponding to the Volterra integral equations.
- Define a Hilbert-Schmidt kernel $K: \Omega \times \Omega \to \mathbb{C}$ on $\Omega = [0,1]$ and its associated Hilbert-Schmidt integral operator $T_K : L^{2}(\Omega)\to L^2(\Omega)$ as
  $$(T_K f)(x) = \int_0^1 K(x, y) f(y) \, \mathrm{d} y.$$
  Then $T_K$ is a compact operator; it is a Hilbert–Schmidt operator with Hilbert-Schmidt norm $\|T_k\|_{\mathrm{HS}}=\|K\|_{L^2}$.
- $T_K$ is a compact self-adjoint operator if and only if $K(x,y)$ is a hermitian kernel which, according to Mercer's theorem, can be represented as
  $$K(x, y) = \sum \lambda_n \varphi_n(x) \overline{\varphi_n(y)},$$
  where $\{\varphi_n\}$ is an orthonormal basis of eigenvectors of $T_K$, with eigenvalues $\{\lambda_n\}$ and the sum converges absolutely and uniformly on $[0,1]$.

== See also ==
- Calkin algebra
- Compact operator – Type of continuous linear operator
- Decomposition of spectrum (functional analysis) – Construction in functional analysis, useful to solve differential equations − If the compactness assumption is removed, operators need not have countable spectrum in general.
- Fredholm operator – Part of Fredholm theories in integral equations
- Singular value decomposition#Bounded operators on Hilbert spaces – Matrix decomposition − The notion of singular values can be extended from matrices to compact operators.
- Spectral theory of compact operators – Theory in functional analysis
- Strictly singular operator
