= Projection-valued measure =

Measure used in functional analysis

In mathematics, particularly in functional analysis, a projection-valued measure, or spectral measure, is a function defined on certain subsets of a fixed set and whose values are self-adjoint projections on a fixed Hilbert space. A projection-valued measure (PVM) is formally similar to a real-valued measure, except that its values are self-adjoint projections rather than real numbers. As in the case of ordinary measures, it is possible to integrate complex-valued functions with respect to a PVM; the result of such an integration is a linear operator on the given Hilbert space.

Projection-valued measures are used to express results in spectral theory, such as the important spectral theorem for self-adjoint operators, in which case the PVM is sometimes referred to as the spectral measure. The Borel functional calculus for self-adjoint operators is constructed using integrals with respect to PVMs. In quantum mechanics, PVMs are the mathematical description of projective measurements. They are generalized by positive operator valued measures (POVMs) in the same sense that a mixed state or density matrix generalizes the notion of a pure state.

== Definition ==
Let $H$ denote a separable complex Hilbert space and $(X, M)$ a measurable space consisting of a set $X$ and a Borel σ-algebra $M$ on $X$. A projection-valued measure $\pi$ is a map from $M$ to the set of bounded self-adjoint operators on $H$ satisfying the following properties:

- $\pi(E)$ is an orthogonal projection for all $E \in M.$
- $\pi(\emptyset) = 0$ and $\pi(X) = I$, where $\emptyset$ is the empty set and $I$ the identity operator.
- If $E_1, E_2, E_3,\dotsc$ in $M$ are disjoint, then for all $v \in H$,

$$\pi\left(\bigcup_{j=1}^{\infty} E_j \right)v = \sum_{j=1}^{\infty} \pi(E_j) v.$$

- $\pi(E_1 \cap E_2)= \pi(E_1)\pi(E_2)$ for all $E_1, E_2 \in M.$

The fourth property is a consequence of the first and third property. The second and fourth property show that if $E_1$ and $E_2$ are disjoint, i.e., $E_1 \cap E_2 = \emptyset$, the images $\pi(E_1)$ and $\pi(E_2)$ are orthogonal to each other.

Let $V_E = \operatorname{im}(\pi(E))$ and its orthogonal complement $V^\perp_E=\ker(\pi(E))$ denote the image and kernel, respectively, of $\pi(E)$. If $V_E$ is a closed subspace of $H$ then $H$ can be wrtitten as the orthogonal decomposition $H=V_E \oplus V^\perp_E$ and $\pi(E)=I_E$ is the unique identity operator on $V_E$ satisfying all four properties.

For every $\xi,\eta\in H$ and $E\in M$ the projection-valued measure forms a complex-valued measure on $H$ defined as

$$\mu_{\xi,\eta}(E) := \langle \pi(E)\xi \mid \eta \rangle$$

with total variation at most $\|\xi\|\|\eta\|$. It reduces to a real-valued measure when

$$\mu_{\xi}(E) := \langle \pi(E)\xi \mid \xi \rangle$$

and a probability measure when $\xi$ is a unit vector.

Example Let $(X, M, \mu)$ be a σ-finite measure space and, for all $E \in M$, let

$$\pi(E) : L^2(X) \to L^2 (X)$$

be defined as

$$\psi \mapsto \pi(E)\psi=1_E \psi,$$

i.e., as multiplication by the indicator function $1_E$ on L^{2}(X). Then $\pi(E)=1_E$ defines a projection-valued measure. For example, if $X = \mathbb{R}$, $E = (0,1)$, and $\varphi,\psi \in L^2(\mathbb{R})$ there is then the associated complex measure $\mu_{\varphi,\psi}$ which takes a measurable function $f: \mathbb{R} \to \mathbb{R}$ and gives the integral

$$\int_E f\,d\mu_{\varphi,\psi} = \int_0^1 f(x)\psi(x)\overline{\varphi}(x)\,dx$$

== Extensions of projection-valued measures ==
If π is a projection-valued measure on a measurable space (X, M), then the map

$$\chi_E \mapsto \pi(E)$$

extends to a linear map on the vector space of step functions on X. In fact, it is easy to check that this map is a ring homomorphism. This map extends in a canonical way to all bounded complex-valued measurable functions on X, and we have the following.

Theorem—For any bounded Borel function $f$ on $X$, there exists a unique bounded operator $T : H \to H$ such that

$$\langle T \xi \mid  \xi \rangle = \int_X f(\lambda) \,d\mu_{\xi}(\lambda), \quad \forall \xi \in H.$$

where $\mu_{\xi}$ is a finite Borel measure given by

$$\mu_{\xi}(E) := \langle \pi(E)\xi \mid \xi \rangle, \quad \forall E \in M.$$

Hence, $(X,M,\mu)$ is a finite measure space.

The theorem is also correct for unbounded measurable functions $f$ but then $T$ will be an unbounded linear operator on the Hilbert space $H$.

=== Spectral theorem ===
Let $H$ be a separable complex Hilbert space, $A:H\to H$ be a bounded self-adjoint operator and $\sigma(A)$ the spectrum of $A$. Then the spectral theorem says that there exists a unique projection-valued measure $\pi^A$, defined on a Borel subset $E \subset \sigma(A)$, such that
$$A =\int_{\sigma(A)} \lambda \, d\pi^A(\lambda),$$
and $\pi^{A}(E)$ is called the spectral projection of $A$. The integral extends to an unbounded function $\lambda$ when the spectrum of $A$ is unbounded.

The spectral theorem allows us to define the Borel functional calculus for any Borel measurable function $g:\mathbb{R}\to\mathbb{C}$ by integrating with respect to the projection-valued measure $\pi^{A}$:
$$g(A) :=\int_\mathbb{R} g(\lambda) \, d\pi^{A}(\lambda).$$
A similar construction holds for normal operators and measurable functions $g:\mathbb{C}\to\mathbb{C}$.

=== Direct integrals ===
First we provide a general example of projection-valued measure based on direct integrals. Suppose (X, M, μ) is a measure space and let {H_{x}}_{x ∈ X} be a μ-measurable family of separable Hilbert spaces. For every E ∈ M, let π(E) be the operator of multiplication by 1_{E} on the Hilbert space

$$\int_X^\oplus H_x \ d \mu(x).$$

Then π is a projection-valued measure on (X, M).

Suppose π, ρ are projection-valued measures on (X, M) with values in the projections of H, K. π, ρ are unitarily equivalent if and only if there is a unitary operator U:H → K such that

$$\pi(E) = U^* \rho(E) U \quad$$

for every E ∈ M.

Theorem. If (X, M) is a standard Borel space, then for every projection-valued measure π on (X, M) taking values in the projections of a separable Hilbert space, there is a Borel measure μ and a μ-measurable family of Hilbert spaces {H_{x}}_{x ∈ X}, such that π is unitarily equivalent to multiplication by 1_{E} on the Hilbert space

$$\int_X^\oplus H_x \ d \mu(x).$$

The measure class of μ and the measure equivalence class of the multiplicity function x → dim H_{x} completely characterize the projection-valued measure up to unitary equivalence.

A projection-valued measure π is homogeneous of multiplicity n if and only if the multiplicity function has constant value n. Clearly,

Theorem. Any projection-valued measure π taking values in the projections of a separable Hilbert space is an orthogonal direct sum of homogeneous projection-valued measures:

$$\pi = \bigoplus_{1 \leq n \leq \omega} (\pi \mid H_n)$$

where

$$H_n = \int_{X_n}^\oplus H_x \ d (\mu \mid X_n) (x)$$

and

$$X_n = \{x \in X: \dim H_x = n\}.$$

== Application in quantum mechanics ==
In quantum mechanics, given a projection-valued measure of a measurable space $X$ to the space of continuous endomorphisms upon a Hilbert space $H$,

- the projective space $\mathbf{P}(H)$ of the Hilbert space $H$ is interpreted as the set of possible (normalizable) states $\varphi$ of a quantum system,
- the measurable space $X$ is the value space for some quantum property of the system (an "observable"),
- the projection-valued measure $\pi$ expresses the probability that the observable takes on various values.

A common choice for $X$ is the real line, but it may also be

- $\mathbb{R}^3$ (for position or momentum in three dimensions ),
- a discrete set (for angular momentum, energy of a bound state, etc.),
- the 2-point set "true" and "false" for the truth-value of an arbitrary proposition about $\varphi$.

Let $E$ be a measurable subset of $X$ and $\varphi$ a normalized vector quantum state in $H$, so that its Hilbert norm is unitary, $\|\varphi\|=1$. The probability that the observable takes its value in $E$, given the system in state $\varphi$, is

$$P_\pi(\varphi)(E) = \langle \varphi\mid\pi(E)(\varphi)\rangle = \langle \varphi\mid\pi(E)\mid\varphi\rangle.$$

We can parse this in two ways. First, for each fixed $E$, the projection $\pi(E)$ is a self-adjoint operator on $H$ whose 1-eigenspace are the states $\varphi$ for which the value of the observable always lies in $E$, and whose 0-eigenspace are the states $\varphi$ for which the value of the observable never lies in $E$.

Second, for each fixed normalized vector state $\varphi$, the association

$$P_\pi(\varphi) :
E \mapsto  \langle\varphi\mid\pi(E)\varphi\rangle$$

is a probability measure on $X$ making the values of the observable into a random variable.

A measurement that can be performed by a projection-valued measure $\pi$ is called a projective measurement.

If $X$ is the real number line, there exists, associated to $\pi$, a self-adjoint operator $A$ defined on $H$ by

$$A(\varphi) = \int_{\mathbb{R}} \lambda \,d\pi(\lambda)(\varphi),$$

which reduces to

$$A(\varphi) = \sum_i \lambda_i \pi({\lambda_i})(\varphi)$$

if the support of $\pi$ is a discrete subset of $X$.

The above operator $A$ is called the observable associated with the spectral measure.

== Generalizations ==
The idea of a projection-valued measure is generalized by the positive operator-valued measure (POVM), where the need for the orthogonality implied by projection operators is replaced by the idea of a set of operators that are a non-orthogonal "partition of unity", i.e. a set of positive semi-definite Hermitian operators that sum to the identity. This generalization is motivated by applications to quantum information theory.

== See also ==
- Spectral theorem
- Spectral theory of compact operators
- Spectral theory of normal C*-algebras
