= Spectral theory of normal C*-algebras =

In functional analysis, every C^{*}-algebra is isomorphic to a subalgebra of the C^{*}-algebra $\mathcal{B}(H)$ of bounded linear operators on some Hilbert space $H.$ This article describes the spectral theory of closed normal subalgebras of $\mathcal{B}(H)$. A subalgebra $A$ of $\mathcal{B}(H)$ is called normal if it is commutative and closed under the $\ast$ operation: for all $x,y\in A$, we have $x^\ast\in A$ and that $xy = yx$.

== Resolution of identity ==
Throughout, $H$ is a fixed Hilbert space.

A projection-valued measure on a measurable space $(X, \Omega),$ where $\Omega$ is a σ-algebra of subsets of $X,$ is a mapping $\pi : \Omega \to \mathcal{B}(H)$ such that for all $\omega \in \Omega,$ $\pi(\omega)$ is a self-adjoint projection on $H$ (that is, $\pi(\omega)$ is a bounded linear operator $\pi(\omega) : H \to H$ that satisfies $\pi(\omega) = \pi(\omega)^*$ and $\pi(\omega) \circ \pi(\omega) = \pi(\omega)$) such that $\pi(X) = \operatorname{Id}_H \quad$ (where $\operatorname{Id}_H$ is the identity operator of $H$) and for every $x, y \in H,$ the function $\Omega \to \Complex$ defined by $\omega \mapsto \langle \pi(\omega)x, y \rangle$ is a complex measure on $M$ (that is, a complex-valued countably additive function).

A resolution of identity on a measurable space $(X, \Omega)$ is a function $\pi : \Omega \to \mathcal{B}(H)$ such that for every $\omega_1, \omega_2 \in \Omega$:

1. $\pi(\varnothing) = 0$;
2. $\pi(X) = \operatorname{Id}_H$;
3. for every $\omega \in \Omega,$ $\pi(\omega)$ is a self-adjoint projection on $H$;
4. for every $x, y \in H,$ the map $\pi_{x, y} : \Omega \to \Complex$ defined by $\pi_{x,y}(\omega) = \langle \pi(\omega) x, y \rangle$ is a complex measure on $\Omega$;
5. $\pi\left(\omega_1 \cap \omega_2\right) = \pi\left(\omega_1\right) \circ \pi\left(\omega_2\right)$;
6. if $\omega_1 \cap \omega_2 = \varnothing$ then $\pi \left(\omega_1 \cup \omega_2\right) = \pi\left(\omega_1\right) + \pi\left(\omega_2\right)$;

If $\Omega$ is the $\sigma$-algebra of all Borels sets on a Hausdorff locally compact (or compact) space, then the following additional requirement is added:

7. for every $x, y \in H,$ the map $\pi_{x, y} : \Omega \to \Complex$ is a regular Borel measure (this is automatically satisfied on compact metric spaces).

Conditions 2, 3, and 4 imply that $\pi$ is a projection-valued measure.

=== Properties ===
Throughout, let $\pi$ be a resolution of identity. For all $x \in H,$ $\pi_{x, x} : \Omega \to \Complex$ is a positive measure on $\Omega$ with total variation $\left\|\pi_{x, x}\right\| = \pi_{x, x}(X) = \|x\|^2$ and that satisfies $\pi_{x, x}(\omega) = \langle \pi(\omega) x, x \rangle = \|\pi(\omega) x\|^2$ for all $\omega \in \Omega.$

For every $\omega_1, \omega_2 \in \Omega$:

- $\pi\left(\omega_1\right) \pi\left(\omega_2\right) = \pi\left(\omega_2\right) \pi\left(\omega_1\right)$ (since both are equal to $\pi\left(\omega_1 \cap \omega_2\right)$).
- If $\omega_1 \cap \omega_2 = \varnothing$ then the ranges of the maps $\pi\left(\omega_1\right)$ and $\pi\left(\omega_2\right)$ are orthogonal to each other and $\pi\left(\omega_1\right) \pi\left(\omega_2\right) = 0 = \pi\left(\omega_2\right) \pi\left(\omega_1\right).$
- $\pi : \Omega \to \mathcal{B}(H)$ is finitely additive.
- If $\omega_1, \omega_2, \ldots$ are pairwise disjoint elements of $\Omega$ whose union is $\omega$ and if $\pi\left(\omega_i\right) = 0$ for all $i$ then $\pi(\omega) = 0.$
  - However, $\pi : \Omega \to \mathcal{B}(H)$ is countably additive only in trivial situations as is now described: suppose that $\omega_1, \omega_2, \ldots$ are pairwise disjoint elements of $\Omega$ whose union is $\omega$ and that the partial sums $\sum_{i=1}^n \pi\left(\omega_i\right)$ converge to $\pi(\omega)$ in $\mathcal{B}(H)$ (with its norm topology) as $n \to \infty$; then since the norm of any projection is either $0$ or $\geq 1,$ the partial sums cannot form a Cauchy sequence unless all but finitely many of the $\pi\left(\omega_i\right)$ are $0.$
- For any fixed $x \in H,$ the map $\pi_x : \Omega \to H$ defined by $\pi_{x}(\omega) := \pi(\omega) x$ is a countably additive $H$-valued measure on $\Omega.$
  - Here countably additive means that whenever $\omega_1, \omega_2, \ldots$ are pairwise disjoint elements of $\Omega$ whose union is $\omega,$ then the partial sums $\sum_{i=1}^n \pi\left(\omega_i\right) x$ converge to $\pi(\omega)x$ in $H.$ Said more succinctly, $\sum_{i=1}^{\infty} \pi\left(\omega_i\right) x = \pi(\omega) x.$
  - In other words, for every pairwise disjoint family of elements $\left(\omega_i\right)_{i = 1}^{\infty}\subseteq \Omega$ whose union is $\omega_{\infty}\in\Omega$, then $\sum_{i = 1}^{n} \pi\left(\omega_i\right) = \pi\left(\bigcup_{i=1}^{n} \omega_i\right)$ (by finite additivity of $\pi$) converges to $\pi\left(\omega_{\infty}\right)$ in the strong operator topology on $\mathcal{B}(H)$: for every $x\in H$, the sequence of elements $\sum_{i=1}^{n}\pi\left(\omega_i\right)x$ converges to $\pi\left(\omega_{\infty}\right)x$ in $H$ (with respect to the norm topology).

== L^{∞}(π) - space of essentially bounded function ==
The $\pi : \Omega \to \mathcal{B}(H)$ be a resolution of identity on $(X, \Omega).$

=== Essentially bounded functions ===
Suppose $f : X \to \Complex$ is a complex-valued $\Omega$-measurable function. There exists a unique largest open subset $V_f$ of $\Complex$ (ordered under subset inclusion) such that $\pi\left(f^{-1}\left(V_f\right)\right) = 0.$ To see why, let $D_1, D_2, \ldots$ be a basis for $\Complex$'s topology consisting of open disks and suppose that $D_{i_1}, D_{i_2}, \ldots$ is the subsequence (possibly finite) consisting of those sets such that $\pi\left(f^{-1}\left(D_{i_k}\right)\right) = 0$; then $D_{i_1} \cup D_{i_2} \cup \cdots = V_f.$ Note that, in particular, if $D$ is an open subset of $\Complex$ such that $D \cap \operatorname{Im} f = \varnothing$ then $\pi\left(f^{-1}(D)\right) = \pi (\varnothing) = 0$ so that $D \subseteq V_f$ (although there are other ways in which $\pi\left(f^{-1}(D)\right)$ may equal 0). Indeed, $\Complex \setminus \operatorname{cl}(\operatorname{Im} f) \subseteq V_f.$

The essential range of $f$ is defined to be the complement of $V_f.$ It is the smallest closed subset of $\Complex$ that contains $f(x)$ for almost all $x \in X$ (that is, for all $x \in X$ except for those in some set $\omega \in \Omega$ such that $\pi(\omega) = 0$). The essential range is a closed subset of $\Complex$ so that if it is also a bounded subset of $\Complex$ then it is compact.

The function $f$ is essentially bounded if its essential range is bounded, in which case define its essential supremum, denoted by $\|f\|^{\infty},$ to be the supremum of all $|\lambda|$ as $\lambda$ ranges over the essential range of $f.$

=== Space of essentially bounded functions ===
Let $\mathcal{B}(X, \Omega)$ be the vector space of all bounded complex-valued $\Omega$-measurable functions $f : X \to \Complex,$ which becomes a Banach algebra when normed by $\|f\|_{\infty} := \sup_{x \in X}|f(x) |.$ The function $\|\,\cdot\,\|^{\infty}$ is a seminorm on $\mathcal{B}(X, \Omega),$ but not necessarily a norm. The kernel of this seminorm, $N^{\infty} := \left\{ f \in \mathcal{B}(X, \Omega) : \|f\|^{\infty} = 0 \right\},$ is a vector subspace of $\mathcal{B}(X, \Omega)$ that is a closed two-sided ideal of the Banach algebra $\left(\mathcal{B}(X, \Omega), \| \cdot \|_{\infty}\right).$ Hence the quotient of $\mathcal{B}(X, \Omega)$ by $N^{\infty}$ is also a Banach algebra, denoted by $L^{\infty}(\pi) := \mathcal{B}(X, \Omega) / N^{\infty}$ where the norm of any element $f + N^{\infty} \in L^{\infty}(\pi)$ is equal to $\|f\|^{\infty}$ (since if $f + N^{\infty} = g + N^{\infty}$ then $\|f\|^{\infty} = \| g \|^{\infty}$) and this norm makes $L^{\infty}(\pi)$ into a Banach algebra. The spectrum of $f + N^{\infty}$ in $L^{\infty}(\pi)$ is the essential range of $f.$ This article will follow the usual practice of writing $f$ rather than $f + N^{\infty}$ to represent elements of $L^{\infty}(\pi).$

Theorem—Let $\pi : \Omega \to \mathcal{B}(H)$ be a resolution of identity on $(X, \Omega).$ There exists a closed normal subalgebra $A$ of $\mathcal{B}(H)$ and an isometric ^{*}-isomorphism $\Psi : L^{\infty}(\pi) \to A$ satisfying the following properties:

1. $\langle \Psi(f) x, y \rangle = \int_X f \operatorname{d} \pi_{x, y}$ for all $x, y \in H$ and $f \in L^{\infty}(\pi),$ which justifies the notation $\Psi(f) = \int_X f \operatorname{d}\pi$;
2. $\|\Psi(f) x\|^2 = \int_X|f|^2 \operatorname{d} \pi_{x, x}$ for all $x \in H$ and $f \in L^{\infty}(\pi)$;
3. an operator $R \in \mathbb{B}(H)$ commutes with every element of $\operatorname{Im} \pi$ if and only if it commutes with every element of $A = \operatorname{Im} \Psi.$
4. if $f$ is a simple function equal to $f = \sum_{i=1}^n \lambda_i \mathbb{1}_{\omega_i},$ where $\omega_1, \ldots \omega_n$ is a partition of $X$ and the $\lambda_i$ are complex numbers, then $\Psi(f) = \sum_{i=1}^n \lambda_i \pi\left(\omega_i\right)$ (here $\mathbb{1}$ is the characteristic function);
5. if $f$ is the limit (in the norm of $L^{\infty}(\pi)$) of a sequence of simple functions $s_1, s_2, \ldots$ in $L^{\infty}(\pi)$ then $\left(\Psi\left(s_i\right)\right)_{i=1}^{\infty}$ converges to$\Psi(f)$ in $\mathcal{B}(H)$ and $\|\Psi(f)\| = \|f\|^{\infty}$;
6. $\left(\|f\|^{\infty}\right)^2 = \sup_{\|h\| \leq 1} \int_X \operatorname{d} \pi_{h, h}$ for every $f \in L^{\infty}(\pi).$

== Spectral theorem ==
The maximal ideal space of a Banach algebra $A$ is the set of all complex homomorphisms $A \to \Complex,$ which we'll denote by $\sigma_A.$ For every $T$ in $A,$ the Gelfand transform of $T$ is the map $G(T) : \sigma_A \to \Complex$ defined by $G(T)(h) := h(T).$ $\sigma_A$ is given the weakest topology making every $G(T) : \sigma_A \to \Complex$ continuous. With this topology, $\sigma_A$ is a compact Hausdorff space and every $T$ in $A,$ $G(T)$ belongs to $C \left(\sigma_A\right),$ which is the space of continuous complex-valued functions on $\sigma_A.$ The range of $G(T)$ is the spectrum $\sigma(T)$ and that the spectral radius is equal to $\max \left\{ |G(T)(h)|: h \in \sigma_A \right\},$ which is $\leq \|T\|.$

Theorem—Suppose $A$ is a closed normal subalgebra of $\mathcal{B}(H)$ that contains the identity operator $\operatorname{Id}_H$ and let $\sigma = \sigma_A$ be the maximal ideal space of $A.$ Let $\Omega$ be the Borel subsets of $\sigma.$ For every $T$ in $A,$ let $G(T) : \sigma_A \to \Complex$ denote the Gelfand transform of $T$ so that $G$ is an injective map $G : A \to C\left(\sigma_A\right).$ There exists a unique resolution of identity $\pi : \Omega \to A$ that satisfies: $\langle T x, y \rangle = \int_{\sigma_A} G(T) \operatorname{d} \pi_{x, y} \quad \text{ for all } x, y \in H \text{ and all } T \in A;$ the notation $T = \int_{\sigma_A} G(T) \operatorname{d} \pi$ is used to summarize this situation. Let $I : \operatorname{Im} G \to A$ be the inverse of the Gelfand transform $G : A \to C\left(\sigma_A\right)$ where $\operatorname{Im} G$ can be canonically identified as a subspace of $L^{\infty}(\pi).$ Let $B$ be the closure (in the norm topology of $\mathcal{B}(H)$) of the linear span of $\operatorname{Im} \pi.$ Then the following are true:

1. $B$ is a closed subalgebra of $\mathcal{B}(H)$ containing $A.$
2. There exists a (linear multiplicative) isometric ^{*}-isomorphism $\Phi : L^{\infty}(\pi) \to B$ extending $I : \operatorname{Im} G \to A$ such that $\Phi f = \int_{\sigma_A} f \operatorname{d} \pi$ for all $f \in L^{\infty}(\pi).$
  - Recall that the notation $\Phi f = \int_{\sigma_A} f \operatorname{d} \pi$ means that $\langle (\Phi f) x, y \rangle = \int_{\sigma_A} f \operatorname{d} \pi_{x, y}$ for all $x, y \in H$;
  - Note in particular that $T = \int_{\sigma_A} G(T) \operatorname{d} \pi = \Phi(G(T))$ for all $T \in A.$
  - Explicitly, $\Phi$ satisfies $\Phi \left(\overline{f}\right) = (\Phi f)^*$ and $\|\Phi f\| = \|f\|^{\infty}$ for every $f \in L^{\infty}(\pi)$ (so if $f$ is real valued then $\Phi(f)$ is self-adjoint).
3. If $\omega \subseteq \sigma_A$ is open and nonempty (which implies that $\omega \in \Omega$) then $\pi(\omega) \neq 0.$
4. A bounded linear operator $S \in \mathcal{B}(H)$ commutes with every element of $A$ if and only if it commutes with every element of $\operatorname{Im} \pi.$

The above result can be specialized to a single normal bounded operator.

== See also ==
- Projection-valued measure – Mathematical operator-value measure of interest in quantum mechanics and functional analysis
- Spectral theory of compact operators
- Spectral theorem – Result about when a matrix can be diagonalized
