= Borel functional calculus =

Branch of functional analysis

In functional analysis, a branch of mathematics, the Borel functional calculus is a functional calculus (that is, an assignment of operators from commutative algebras to functions defined on their spectra), which has particularly broad scope. Thus for instance if T is an operator, applying the squaring function s → s^{2} to T yields the operator T^{2}. Using the functional calculus for larger classes of functions, we can for example define rigorously the "square root" of the (negative) Laplacian operator −Δ or the exponential $e^{it \Delta}.$

The 'scope' here means the kind of function of an operator which is allowed. The Borel functional calculus is more general than the continuous functional calculus, and its focus is different than the holomorphic functional calculus.

More precisely, the Borel functional calculus allows for applying an arbitrary Borel function to a self-adjoint operator, in a way that generalizes applying a polynomial function.

== Motivation ==
If T is a self-adjoint operator on a finite-dimensional inner product space H, then H has an orthonormal basis {e_{1}, ..., e_{ℓ}} consisting of eigenvectors of T, that is
$$T e_k = \lambda_k e_k, \qquad 1 \leq k \leq \ell.$$

Thus, for any positive integer n,
$$T^n e_k = \lambda_k^n e_k.$$

If only polynomials in T are considered, then one gets the holomorphic functional calculus. The relation also holds for more general functions of T. Given a Borel function h, one can define an operator h(T) by specifying its behavior on the basis:
$$h(T) e_k = h(\lambda_k) e_k.$$

Generally, any self-adjoint operator T is unitarily equivalent to a multiplication operator; this means that for many purposes, T can be considered as an operator
$$[T \psi](x) = f(x) \psi(x)$$
acting on L^{2} of some measure space. The domain of T consists of those functions whose above expression is in L^{2}. In such a case, one can define analogously
$$[h(T) \psi](x) = [h \circ f](x) \psi(x).$$

For many technical purposes, the previous formulation is good enough. However, it is desirable to formulate the functional calculus in a way that does not depend on the particular representation of T as a multiplication operator. That's what we do in the next section.

== The bounded functional calculus ==
Formally, the bounded Borel functional calculus of a self adjoint operator T on Hilbert space H is a mapping defined on the space of bounded complex-valued Borel functions f on the real line,
$$\begin{cases} \pi_T: L^\infty(\mathbb{R},\mathbb{C}) \to \mathcal{B}(\mathcal{H})\\ f \mapsto f(T) \end{cases}$$
such that the following conditions hold

- π_{T} is an involution-preserving and unit-preserving homomorphism from the ring of complex-valued bounded measurable functions on R.
- If ξ is an element of H, then
  $$\nu_\xi:E \mapsto \langle \pi_T(\mathbf{1}_E) \xi, \xi \rangle$$
  is a countably additive measure on the Borel sets E of R. In the above formula 1_{E} denotes the indicator function of E. These measures ν_{ξ} are called the spectral measures of T.
- If η denotes the mapping z → z on C, then:
  $$\pi_T \left ([\eta +i]^{-1} \right ) = [T + i]^{-1}.$$

Theorem— Any self-adjoint operator T has a unique Borel functional calculus.

This defines the functional calculus for bounded functions applied to possibly unbounded self-adjoint operators. Using the bounded functional calculus, one can prove part of the Stone's theorem on one-parameter unitary groups:

Theorem— If A is a self-adjoint operator, then
$$U_t = e^{i t A}, \qquad t \in \mathbb{R}$$
is a 1-parameter strongly continuous unitary group whose infinitesimal generator is iA.

As an application, we consider the Schrödinger equation, or equivalently, the dynamics of a quantum mechanical system. In non-relativistic quantum mechanics, the Hamiltonian operator H models the total energy observable of a quantum mechanical system S. The unitary group generated by iH corresponds to the time evolution of S.

We can also use the Borel functional calculus to abstractly solve some linear initial value problems such as the heat equation, or Maxwell's equations.

=== Existence of a functional calculus ===
The existence of a mapping with the properties of a functional calculus requires proof. For the case of a bounded self-adjoint operator T, the existence of a Borel functional calculus can be shown in an elementary way as follows:

First pass from polynomial to continuous functional calculus by using the Stone–Weierstrass theorem. The crucial fact here is that, for a bounded self adjoint operator T and a polynomial p,
$$\| p(T) \| = \sup_{\lambda \in \sigma(T)} |p(\lambda)|.$$

Consequently, the mapping
$$p \mapsto p(T)$$
is an isometry and a densely defined homomorphism on the ring of polynomial functions. Extending by continuity defines f(T) for a continuous function f on the spectrum of T. The Riesz-Markov theorem then allows us to pass from integration on continuous functions to spectral measures, and this is the Borel functional calculus.

Alternatively, the continuous calculus can be obtained via the Gelfand transform, in the context of commutative Banach algebras. Extending to measurable functions is achieved by applying Riesz-Markov, as above. In this formulation, T can be a normal operator.

Given an operator T, the range of the continuous functional calculus h → h(T) is the (abelian) C*-algebra C(T) generated by T. The Borel functional calculus has a larger range, that is the closure of C(T) in the weak operator topology, a (still abelian) von Neumann algebra.

== The general functional calculus ==
We can also define the functional calculus for not necessarily bounded Borel functions h; the result is an operator which in general fails to be bounded. Using the multiplication by a function f model of a self-adjoint operator given by the spectral theorem, this is multiplication by the composition of h with f.

Theorem— Let T be a self-adjoint operator on H, h a real-valued Borel function on R. There is a unique operator S such that
$$\operatorname{dom} S = \left\{\xi \in H: h \in L^2_{\nu_\xi}(\mathbb{R}) \right\}$$
$$\langle S \xi, \xi \rangle = \int_{\mathbb{R}} h(t) \ d\nu_{\xi} (t), \quad \text{for} \quad \xi \in \operatorname{dom} S$$

The operator S of the previous theorem is denoted h(T).

More generally, a Borel functional calculus also exists for (bounded) normal operators.

== Resolution of the identity ==
Let $T$ be a self-adjoint operator. If $E$ is a Borel subset of R, and $\mathbf{1}_E$ is the indicator function of E, then $\mathbf{1}_E(T)$ is a self-adjoint projection on H. Then mapping
$$\Omega_T: E \mapsto \mathbf{1}_E(T)$$
is a projection-valued measure. The measure of R with respect to $\Omega_T$ is the identity operator on H. In other words, the identity operator can be expressed as the spectral integral

$$I = \Omega_T([-\infty,\infty]) = \int_{-\infty}^{\infty} d\Omega_T$$.

Stone's formula expresses the spectral measure $\Omega_T$ in terms of the resolvent $R_T(\lambda) \equiv \left(T-\lambda I \right)^{-1}$:

$$\frac{1}{2\pi i} \lim_{\epsilon \to 0^+} \int_a^b \left[ R_T(\lambda+i\epsilon)) - R_T(\lambda-i\epsilon) \right] \, d\lambda = \Omega_T((a,b)) + \frac{1}{2}\left[ \Omega_T(\{a\}) + \Omega_T(\{b\}) \right].$$

Depending on the source, the resolution of the identity is defined, either as a projection-valued measure $\Omega_T$, or as a one-parameter family of projection-valued measures $\{\Sigma_\lambda\}$ with $-\infty < \lambda < \infty$.

In the case of a discrete measure (in particular, when H is finite-dimensional), $I = \int 1\,d\Omega_T$ can be written as
$$I = \sum_{i} \left | i \right \rangle  \left \langle i \right |$$
in the Dirac notation, where each $|i\rangle$ is a normalized eigenvector of T. The set $\{ |i\rangle \}$ is an orthonormal basis of H.

In physics literature, using the above as heuristic, one passes to the case when the spectral measure is no longer discrete and write the resolution of identity as
$$I = \int\!\!   di~ |i\rangle \langle i|$$
and speak of a "continuous basis", or "continuum of basis states", $\{ |i\rangle \}$ Mathematically, unless rigorous justifications are given, this expression is purely formal.
