= Spectral theory of compact operators =

Theory in functional analysis

In functional analysis, compact operators are linear operators on Banach spaces that map bounded sets to relatively compact sets. In the case of a Hilbert space H, the compact operators are the closure of the finite rank operators in the uniform operator topology. In general, operators on infinite-dimensional spaces feature properties that do not appear in the finite-dimensional case, i.e. for matrices. The compact operators are notable in that they share as much similarity with matrices as one can expect from a general operator. In particular, the spectral properties of compact operators resemble those of square matrices.

This article first summarizes the corresponding results from the matrix case before discussing the spectral properties of compact operators. The reader will see that most statements transfer verbatim from the matrix case.

The spectral theory of compact operators was first developed by F. Riesz.

== Spectral theory of matrices ==
The classical result for square matrices is the Jordan canonical form, which states the following:

Theorem. Let A be an n × n complex matrix, i.e. A a linear operator acting on C^{n}. If λ_{1}...λ_{k} are the distinct eigenvalues of A, then C^{n} can be decomposed into the invariant subspaces of A

$$\mathbf{C}^n = \bigoplus _{i = 1}^k Y_i.$$

The subspace Y_{i} = Ker(λ_{i} − A)^{m} where Ker(λ_{i} − A)^{m} = Ker(λ_{i} − A)^{m+1}. Furthermore, the poles of the resolvent function ζ → (ζ − A)^{−1} coincide with the set of eigenvalues of A.

== Compact operators ==
=== Statement ===
Theorem—Let X be a Banach space, C be a compact operator acting on X, and σ(C) be the spectrum of C.

1. Every nonzero λ ∈ σ(C) is an eigenvalue of C.
2. For all nonzero λ ∈ σ(C), there exists m such that Ker((λ − C)^{m}) = Ker((λ − C)^{m+1}), and this subspace is finite-dimensional. It is called the generalized eigenspace for λ.
3. The eigenvalues can only accumulate at 0.
4. σ(C) is at most countably infinite.
5. If the dimension of X is not finite, then σ(C) must contain 0.
6. Every nonzero λ ∈ σ(C) is a pole of the resolvent function ζ → (ζ − C)^{−1}.

=== Proof ===
Preliminary Lemmas

The theorem claims several properties of the operator λ − C where λ ≠ 0. Without loss of generality, it can be assumed that λ = 1. Therefore, we consider I − C, I being the identity operator. The proof will require two lemmas.

Lemma 1 (Riesz's lemma)—Let X be a Banach space and Y ⊂ X, Y ≠ X, be a closed subspace. For all ε > 0, there exists x ∈ X such that $\|$x$\|$ = 1 and

$$1 - \varepsilon \le d(x, Y) \le 1$$

where d(x, Y) is the distance from x to Y.

This fact will be used repeatedly in the argument leading to the theorem. Notice that when X is a Hilbert space, the lemma is trivial.

Lemma 2—If C is compact, then Ran(I − C) is closed.

Proof

Let $(I-C) x_n \to y$ in norm.

If $d\left(x_n, \operatorname{Ker}(I-C)\right)$ is bounded, then there exists a sequence $m_n \in \operatorname{Ker}(I-C)$ such that $(x_n - m_n)_n$ is bounded, and we still have $(I-C)(x_n - m_n) \to y$.

So WLOG, $(x_n)_n$ is bounded. Then compactness of $C$ implies that there exists a subsequence $x_{n_k}$ such that $C x_{n_k}$ is norm convergent. So $x_{n_k}=(I-C) x_{n_k}+C x_{n_k}$ is norm convergent, to some $x$. Thus $y = (I-C) x \in \operatorname{Ran}(I-C)$.

Now we show that $d\left(x_n, \operatorname{Ker}(I-C)\right)$ is bounded.

If not, then select a divergent subsequence $x_n$, and define vectors $z_n = x_n / \|x_n + \operatorname{Ker}(I-C)\|_{X/\operatorname{Ker}(I-C)}$.

Since $\|x_n + \operatorname{Ker}(I-C)\|_{X/\operatorname{Ker}(I-C)} = d\left(x_n, \operatorname{Ker}(I-C)\right)$ is unbounded, we have $(I-C)z_n \to 0$. Further, we also have that $z_n + M$ is a sequence of unit vectors in $X/\operatorname{Ker}(I-C)$.

So by the previous half of the proof, there exists a convergent subsequence $z_{n_k} \to z$, such that $(I-C)z = 0$, so $z \in \operatorname{Ker}(I-C)$, so $z + \operatorname{Ker}(I-C)$ is a zero vector, contradiction.

Concluding the Proof

Proof

i) Without loss of generality, assume λ = 1.

Assume $1$ is not an eigenvalue, then $I - C$ is injective. Since it is bounded, but has no bounded inverse, it is not surjective, by the bounded inverse theorem.

By Lemma 2, Y_{1} = Ran(I − C) is a closed proper subspace of X. Since (I − C) is injective, Y_{2} = (I − C)Y_{1} is again a closed proper subspace of Y_{1}. Define Y_{n} = Ran(I − C)^{n}. Consider the decreasing sequence of subspaces

$$Y_1 \supset \cdots \supset Y_n \cdots \supset Y_m \cdots$$

where all inclusions are proper, since $I-C$ is injective. By Riesz's lemma, we can choose unit vectors y_{n} ∈ Y_{n} such that d(y_{n}, Y_{n+1}) > ½. Compactness of C means {C y_{n}} has a convergent subsequence. But for n < m

$$\left \| C y_n - C y_m \right \| = \left \| (C-I) y_n + y_n - (C-I) y_m - y_m \right \|$$

and notice that $(C-I) y_n \in Y_{n+1}, \; (C-I) y_m \in Y_{m+1} \subset Y_{n+2}, \; y_m \in Y_{m} \subset Y_{n+1}$, thus

$$(C-I) y_n - (C-I) y_m - y_m  \in Y_{n+1},$$

which implies $\|$Cy_{n} − Cy_{m}$\|$ > ½, so it cannot have a convergent subsequence. Contradiction. ▮

ii) Consider the sequence { Y_{n} = Ker( λ − C)^{n}} of closed subspaces. It satisfies $Ker(\lambda - C)^1 \subset Ker(\lambda - C)^2 \subset \cdots$. If we ever have some $Ker(\lambda - C)^n = Ker(\lambda - C)^{n+1}$, then the sequence stops increasing from there on.

The theorem claims it stops increasing after finitely many steps. Suppose it does not stop, i.e. the inclusion Ker( λ − C)^{n} ⊂ Ker( λ − C)^{n+1} is proper for all n. By Riesz's lemma, there exists a sequence {y_{n}}_{n ≥ 2} of unit vectors such that y_{n} ∈ Y_{n} and d(y_{n}, Y_{n − 1}) > ½. As before, compactness of C means {C y_{n}} must contain a norm convergent subsequence. But for n < m

$$\| C y_n - C y_m \| = \| (C-I) y_n + y_n - (C-I) y_m - y_m \|$$

and notice that

$$(C-I) y_n + y_n - (C-I) y_m  \in Y_{m-1},$$

which implies $\|$Cy_{n} − Cy_{m}$\|$ > ½. This is a contradiction, and so the sequence { Y_{n} = Ker( λ − C)^{n}} must terminate at some finite m.

Ker( λ − C)^{n} is compact by induction on $n$. By Riesz's lemma, this means it is finite-dimensional.

For $n = 1$, given any sequence $x_n \in Ker(\lambda - C)$ with norm bounded by 1, by compactness of $C$, there exists a subsequence such that $x_{n_k} = Cx_{n_k} / \lambda \to y$. Thus, the closed unit ball in $Ker(\lambda - C)$ is compact.

Induct. Let $x_n \in Ker(\lambda - C)^{n+1}$ be a sequence in the unit ball with norm bounded by 1. Now, $(\lambda - C)x_{n_k}$ is contained within a ball in $Ker(\lambda - C)^{n}$, which is compact by induction. We also use the compactness of the operator. So we take subsequences twice, to obtain some $x_{n_k}$, such that $Cx_{n_k}$ and $(\lambda - C)x_{n_k}$ are both convergent, so $x_{n_k}$ is also convergent. ▮

iii) Suppose there exist infinite (at least countable) distinct {λ_{n}} in the spectrum, such that $|$λ_{n}$|$ > ε for all n. We derive a contradiction, thus concluding that there are no nonzero accumulation points.

By part i, they are eigenvalues. Pick corresponding eigenvectors {x_{n}}.

Define Y_{n} = span{x_{1}...x_{n}}. The sequence {Y_{n}} is a strictly increasing sequence. Choose unit vectors such that y_{n} ∈ Y^{n} and d(y_{n}, Y^{n − 1}) > ½. Then for n < m

$$\left \| C y_n - C y_m \right \| = \left \| (C- \lambda_n) y_n + \lambda_n y_n - (C- \lambda_m) y_m - \lambda_m y_m \right \|.$$

Since $(C- \lambda_n) y_n \in Y_{n-1} \subset Y_{m-1}, \; \lambda_n y_n \in Y_n \subset Y_{m-1}, \; (C- \lambda_m) y_m \subset Y_{m-1}$, we have

$$(C- \lambda_n) y_n + \lambda_n y_n - (C- \lambda_m) y_m \in Y_{m-1},$$

therefore $\|$Cy_{n} − Cy_{m}$\|$ > ε/2, a contradiction. ▮

iv) By iii) and the Cantor–Bendixson theorem. ▮

v) If $\sigma(C)$ does not contain zero, then $C$ has a bounded inverse, so $I = C^{-1}C$ is compact, so $X$ is finite-dimensional. ▮

vi) As in the matrix case, this is a direct application of the holomorphic functional calculus. ▮

=== Invariant subspaces ===
As in the matrix case, the above spectral properties lead to a decomposition of X into invariant subspaces of a compact operator C. Let λ ≠ 0 be an eigenvalue of C; so λ is an isolated point of σ(C). Using the holomorphic functional calculus, define the Riesz projection E(λ) by

$$E(\lambda) = {1\over 2\pi i}\int _{\gamma} (\xi - C)^{-1} d \xi$$

where γ is a Jordan contour that encloses only λ from σ(C). Let Y be the subspace Y = E(λ)X. C restricted to Y is a compact invertible operator with spectrum {λ}, therefore Y is finite-dimensional. Let ν be such that Ker(λ − C)^{ν} = Ker(λ − C)^{ν + 1}. By inspecting the Jordan form, we see that (λ − C)^{ν} = 0 while (λ − C)^{ν − 1} ≠ 0. The Laurent series of the resolvent mapping centered at λ shows that

$$E(\lambda) (\lambda - C)^{\nu} = (\lambda - C)^{\nu}E(\lambda) = 0.$$

So Y = Ker(λ − C)^{ν}.

The E(λ) satisfy E(λ)^{2} = E(λ), so that they are indeed projection operators or spectral projections. By definition they commute with C. Moreover E(λ)E(μ) = 0 if λ ≠ μ.

- Let X(λ) = E(λ)X if λ is a non-zero eigenvalue. Thus X(λ) is a finite-dimensional invariant subspace, the generalised eigenspace of λ.
- Let X(0) be the intersection of the kernels of the E(λ). Thus X(0) is a closed subspace invariant under C and the restriction of C to X(0) is a compact operator with spectrum {0}.

=== Operators with compact power ===
If B is an operator on a Banach space X such that B^{n} is compact for some n, then the theorem proven above also holds for B.

== See also ==
- Spectral theorem
- Spectral theory of normal C*-algebras
