= Positive element =

In mathematics, an element of a *-algebra is called positive if it is the sum of elements of the form $a^*a$.

== Definition ==
Let $\mathcal{A}$ be a *-algebra. An element $a \in \mathcal{A}$ is called positive if there are finitely many elements $a_k \in \mathcal{A} \; (k = 1,2,\ldots,n)$, so that $a = \sum_{k=1}^n a_k^*a_k$ holds. This is also denoted by $a \geq 0$.

The set of positive elements is denoted by $\mathcal{A}_+$.

A special case from particular importance is the case where $\mathcal{A}$ is a complete normed *-algebra, that satisfies the C*-identity ($\left\| a^*a \right\| = \left\| a \right\|^2 \ \forall a \in \mathcal{A}$), which is called a C*-algebra.

== Examples ==
- The unit element $e$ of an unital *-algebra is positive.
- For each element $a \in \mathcal{A}$, the elements $a^* a$ and $aa^*$ are positive by definition.

In case $\mathcal{A}$ is a C*-algebra, the following holds:

- Let $a \in \mathcal{A}_N$ be a normal element, then for every positive function $f \geq 0$ which is continuous on the spectrum of $a$ the continuous functional calculus defines a positive element $f(a)$.
- Every projection, i.e. every element $a \in \mathcal{A}$ for which $a = a^* = a^2$ holds, is positive. For the spectrum $\sigma(a)$ of such an idempotent element, $\sigma(a) \subseteq \{ 0, 1 \}$ holds, as can be seen from the continuous functional calculus.

== Criteria ==
Let $\mathcal{A}$ be a C*-algebra and $a \in \mathcal{A}$. Then the following are equivalent:

- For the spectrum $\sigma(a) \subseteq [0, \infty)$ holds and $a$ is a normal element.
- There exists an element $b \in \mathcal{A}$, such that $a = bb^*$.
- There exists a (unique) self-adjoint element $c \in \mathcal{A}_{sa}$ such that $a = c^2$.

If $\mathcal{A}$ is a unital *-algebra with unit element $e$, then in addition the following statements are equivalent:

- $\left\| te - a \right\| \leq t$ for every $t \geq \left\| a \right\|$ and $a$ is a self-adjoint element.
- $\left\| te - a \right\| \leq t$ for some $t \geq \left\| a \right\|$ and $a$ is a self-adjoint element.

== Properties ==
=== In *-algebras ===
Let $\mathcal{A}$ be a *-algebra. Then:

- If $a \in \mathcal{A}_+$ is a positive element, then $a$ is self-adjoint.
- The set of positive elements $\mathcal{A}_+$ is a convex cone in the real vector space of the self-adjoint elements $\mathcal{A}_{sa}$. This means that $\alpha a, a+b \in \mathcal{A}_+$ holds for all $a,b \in \mathcal{A}$ and $\alpha \in [0, \infty)$.
- If $a \in \mathcal{A}_+$ is a positive element, then $b^*ab$ is also positive for every element $b \in \mathcal{A}$.
- For the linear span of $\mathcal{A}_+$ the following holds: $\langle \mathcal{A}_+ \rangle = \mathcal{A}^2$ and $\mathcal{A}_+ - \mathcal{A}_+ = \mathcal{A}_{sa} \cap \mathcal{A}^2$.

=== In C*-algebras ===
Let $\mathcal{A}$ be a C*-algebra. Then:

- Using the continuous functional calculus, for every $a \in \mathcal{A}_+$ and $n \in \mathbb{N}$ there is a uniquely determined $b \in \mathcal{A}_+$ that satisfies $b^n = a$, i.e. a unique $n$-th root. In particular, a square root exists for every positive element. Since for every $b \in \mathcal{A}$ the element $b^*b$ is positive, this allows the definition of a unique absolute value: $|b| = (b^*b)^\frac{1}{2}$.
- For every real number $\alpha \geq 0$ there is a positive element $a^\alpha \in \mathcal{A}_+$ for which $a^\alpha a^\beta = a^{\alpha + \beta}$ holds for all $\beta \in [0, \infty)$. The mapping $\alpha \mapsto a^\alpha$ is continuous. Negative values for $\alpha$ are also possible for invertible elements $a$.
- Products of positive commutative elements are also positive. So if $ab = ba$ holds for positive $a,b \in \mathcal{A}_+$, then $ab \in \mathcal{A}_+$.
- Each element $a \in \mathcal{A}$ can be uniquely represented as a linear combination of four positive elements. To do this, $a$ is first decomposed into the self-adjoint real and imaginary parts and these are then decomposed into positive and negative parts using the continuous functional calculus. For it holds that $\mathcal{A}_{sa} = \mathcal{A}_+ - \mathcal{A}_+$, since $\mathcal{A}^2 = \mathcal{A}$.
- If both $a$ and $-a$ are positive $a = 0$ holds.
- If $\mathcal{B}$ is a C*-subalgebra of $\mathcal{A}$, then $\mathcal{B}_+ = \mathcal{B} \cap \mathcal{A}_+$.
- If $\mathcal{B}$ is another C*-algebra and $\Phi$ is a *-homomorphism from $\mathcal{A}$ to $\mathcal{B}$, then $\Phi(\mathcal{A}_+) = \Phi(\mathcal{A}) \cap \mathcal{B}_+$ holds.
- If $a,b \in \mathcal{A}_+$ are positive elements for which $ab = 0$, they commutate and $\left\| a + b \right\| = \max(\left\| a \right\|, \left\| b \right\|)$ holds. Such elements are called orthogonal and one writes $a \bot b$.

== Partial order ==
Let $\mathcal{A}$ be a *-algebra. The property of being a positive element defines a translation invariant partial order on the set of self-adjoint elements $\mathcal{A}_{sa}$. If $b - a \in \mathcal{A}_+$ holds for $a,b \in \mathcal{A}$, one writes $a \leq b$ or $b \geq a$.

This partial order fulfills the properties $ta \leq tb$ and $a + c \leq b + c$ for all $a,b,c \in \mathcal{A}_{sa}$ with $a \leq b$ and $t \in [0, \infty)$.

If $\mathcal{A}$ is a C*-algebra, the partial order also has the following properties for $a,b \in \mathcal{A}$:

- If $a \leq b$ holds, then $c^*ac \leq c^*bc$ is true for every $c \in \mathcal{A}$. For every $c \in \mathcal{A}_+$ that commutes with $a$ and $b$ even $ac \leq bc$ holds.
- If $-b \leq a \leq b$ holds, then $\left\| a \right\| \leq \left\| b \right\|$.
- If $0 \leq a \leq b$ holds, then $a^\alpha \leq b^\alpha$ holds for all real numbers $0 < \alpha \leq 1$.
- If $a$ is invertible and $0 \leq a \leq b$ holds, then $b$ is invertible and for the inverses $b^{-1} \leq a^{-1}$ holds.

== See also ==
- Nonnegative matrix
- Positive operator (Hilbert space)

== Citations ==
=== Bibliography ===
- Blackadar, Bruce (2006). Operator Algebras. Theory of C*-Algebras and von Neumann Algebras. Berlin/Heidelberg: Springer. ISBN 3-540-28486-9.
- Dixmier, Jacques (1977). C*-algebras. Translated by Jellett, Francis. Amsterdam/New York/Oxford: North-Holland. ISBN 0-7204-0762-1. English translation of Les C*-algèbres et leurs représentations (in French). Gauthier-Villars. 1969.
- Kadison, Richard V.; Ringrose, John R. (1983). Fundamentals of the Theory of Operator Algebras. Volume 1 Elementary Theory. New York/London: Academic Press. ISBN 0-12-393301-3.
- Palmer, Theodore W. (2001). Banach algebras and the general theory of*-algebras: Volume 2,*-algebras. Cambridge university press. ISBN 0-521-36638-0.
