= Unitary element =

In mathematics, an element of a *-algebra is called unitary if it is invertible and its inverse element is the same as its adjoint element.

== Definition ==
Let $\mathcal{A}$ be a *-algebra with unit $e$. An element $a \in \mathcal{A}$ is called unitary if $aa^* = a^*a = e$. In other words, if $a$ is invertible and $a^{-1} = a^*$ holds, then $a$ is unitary.

The set of unitary elements is denoted by $\mathcal{A}_U$ or $U(\mathcal{A})$.

A special case from particular importance is the case where $\mathcal{A}$ is a complete normed *-algebra. This algebra satisfies the C*-identity ($\left\| a^*a \right\| = \left\| a \right\|^2 \ \forall a \in \mathcal{A}$) and is called a C*-algebra.

== Criteria ==
- Let $\mathcal{A}$ be a unital C*-algebra and $a \in \mathcal{A}_N$ a normal element. Then, $a$ is unitary if the spectrum $\sigma(a)$ consists only of elements of the circle group $\mathbb{T}$, i.e. $\sigma(a) \subseteq \mathbb{T} = \{ \lambda \in \Complex \mid | \lambda | = 1 \}$.

== Examples ==
- The unit $e$ is unitary.

Let $\mathcal{A}$ be a unital C*-algebra, then:

- Every projection, i.e. every element $a \in \mathcal{A}$ with $a = a^* = a^2$, is unitary. For the spectrum of a projection consists of at most $0$ and $1$, as follows from the continuous functional calculus.
- If $a \in \mathcal{A}_{N}$ is a normal element of a C*-algebra $\mathcal{A}$, then for every continuous function $f$ on the spectrum $\sigma(a)$ the continuous functional calculus defines an unitary element $f(a)$, if $f(\sigma(a)) \subseteq \mathbb{T}$.

== Properties ==
Let $\mathcal{A}$ be a unital *-algebra and $a,b \in \mathcal{A}_U$. Then:

- The element $ab$ is unitary, since $((ab)^*)^{-1} = (b^*a^*)^{-1} = (a^*)^{-1} (b^*)^{-1} = ab$. In particular, $\mathcal{A}_U$ forms a multiplicative group.
- The element $a$ is normal.
- The adjoint element $a^*$ is also unitary, since $a = (a^*)^*$ holds for the involution *.
- If $\mathcal{A}$ is a C*-algebra, $a$ has norm 1, i.e. $\left\| a \right \| = 1$.

== See also ==
- Unitary matrix
- Unitary operator
