= Continuous functional calculus =

In mathematics, particularly in operator theory and C*-algebra theory, the continuous functional calculus is a functional calculus which allows the application of a continuous function to normal elements of a C*-algebra.

In advanced theory, the applications of this functional calculus are so natural that they are often not even mentioned. It is no overstatement to say that the continuous functional calculus makes the difference between C*-algebras and general Banach algebras, in which only a holomorphic functional calculus exists.

== Motivation ==
If one wants to extend the natural functional calculus for polynomials on the spectrum $\sigma(a)$ of an element $a$ of a Banach algebra $\mathcal{A}$ to a functional calculus for continuous functions $C(\sigma(a))$ on the spectrum, it seems obvious to approximate a continuous function by polynomials according to the Stone-Weierstrass theorem, to insert the element into these polynomials and to show that this sequence of elements converges to $\mathcal{A}$. The continuous functions on $\sigma(a) \subset \C$ are approximated by polynomials in $z$ and $\overline{z}$, i.e. by polynomials of the form $p(z, \overline{z}) = \sum_{k,l=0}^N c_{k,l} z^k\overline{z}^l \; \left( c_{k,l} \in \C \right)$. Here, $\overline{z}$ denotes the complex conjugation, which is an involution on the complex numbers. To be able to insert $a$ in place of $z$ in this kind of polynomial, Banach *-algebras are considered, i.e. Banach algebras that also have an involution *, and $a^*$ is inserted in place of $\overline{z}$. In order to obtain a homomorphism ${\mathbb C}[z,\overline{z}]\rightarrow\mathcal{A}$, a restriction to normal elements, i.e. elements with $a^*a = aa^*$, is necessary, as the polynomial ring $\C[z,\overline{z}]$ is commutative. If $(p_n(z,\overline{z}))_n$ is a sequence of polynomials that converges uniformly on $\sigma(a)$ to a continuous function $f$, the convergence of the sequence $(p_n(a,a^*))_n$ in $\mathcal{A}$ to an element $f(a)$ must be ensured. A detailed analysis of this convergence problem shows that it is necessary to resort to C*-algebras. These considerations lead to the so-called continuous functional calculus.

== Theorem ==
continuous functional calculus—Let $a$ be a normal element of the C*-algebra $\mathcal{A}$ with unit element $e$ and let $C (\sigma(a))$ be the commutative C*-algebra of continuous functions on $\sigma(a)$, the spectrum of $a$. Then there exists exactly one *-homomorphism $\Phi_a \colon C (\sigma(a)) \rightarrow \mathcal{A}$ with $\Phi_a (\boldsymbol{1}) = e$ for $\boldsymbol{1}(z) = 1$ and $\Phi_a(\operatorname{Id}_{\sigma(a)}) = a$ for the identity.

The mapping $\Phi_a$ is called the continuous functional calculus of the normal element $a$. Usually it is suggestively set $f(a) := \Phi_a(f)$.

Due to the *-homomorphism property, the following calculation rules apply to all functions $f,g \in C(\sigma(a))$ and scalars $\lambda,\mu \in \C$:

- $(\lambda f + \mu g)(a) = \lambda f(a) + \mu g(a) \qquad$
(linear)
- $(f \cdot g)(a) = f (a) \cdot g(a)$
(multiplicative)
- $\overline{f}(a) =\colon \; (f^*)(a) = (f(a))^*$
(involutive)

One can therefore imagine actually inserting the normal elements into continuous functions; the obvious algebraic operations behave as expected.

The requirement for a unit element is not a significant restriction. If necessary, a unit element can be adjoined, yielding the enlarged C*-algebra $\mathcal{A}_1$. Then if $a \in \mathcal{A}$ and $f \in C(\sigma (a))$ with $f(0) = 0$, it follows that $0 \in \sigma (a)$ and $f(a)\in \mathcal{A} \subset \mathcal{A}_1$.

The existence and uniqueness of the continuous functional calculus are proven separately:

- Existence: Since the spectrum of $a$ in the C*-subalgebra $C^*(a,e)$ generated by $a$ and $e$ is the same as it is in $\mathcal{A}$, it suffices to show the statement for $\mathcal{A} = C^*(a,e)$. The actual construction is almost immediate from the Gelfand representation: it suffices to assume $\mathcal{A}$ is the C*-algebra of continuous functions on some compact space $X$ and define $\Phi_a(f) = f \circ x$.
- Uniqueness: Since $\Phi_a(\boldsymbol{1})$ and $\Phi_a(\operatorname{Id}_{\sigma(a)})$ are fixed, $\Phi_a$ is already uniquely defined for all polynomials $p(z, \overline{z}) = \sum_{k,l=0}^N c_{k,l} z^k\overline{z}^l \; \left( c_{k,l} \in \C \right)$, since $\Phi_a$ is a *-homomorphism. These form a dense subalgebra of $C(\sigma(a))$ by the Stone-Weierstrass theorem. Thus $\Phi_a$ is unique.

In functional analysis, the continuous functional calculus for a normal operator $T$ is often of interest, i.e. the case where $\mathcal{A}$ is the C*-algebra $\mathcal{B}(H)$ of bounded operators on a Hilbert space $H$. In the literature, the continuous functional calculus is often only proved for self-adjoint operators in this setting. In this case, the proof does not need the Gelfand representation.

== Further properties of the continuous functional calculus ==
The continuous functional calculus $\Phi_a$ is an isometric isomorphism into the C*-subalgebra $C^*(a,e)$ generated by $a$ and $e$, that is:

- $\left\| \Phi_a(f) \right\| = \left\| f \right\|_{\sigma(a)}$ for all $f \in C(\sigma(a))$; $\Phi_a$ is therefore continuous.
- $\Phi_a \left( C(\sigma(a)) \right) = C^*(a, e) \subseteq \mathcal{A}$

Since $a$ is a normal element of $\mathcal{A}$, the C*-subalgebra generated by $a$ and $e$ is commutative. In particular, $f(a)$ is normal and all elements of a functional calculus commutate.

The holomorphic functional calculus is extended by the continuous functional calculus in an unambiguous way. Therefore, for polynomials $p(z,\overline{z})$ the continuous functional calculus corresponds to the natural functional calculus for polynomials: $\Phi_a(p(z, \overline{z})) = p(a, a^*) = \sum_{k,l=0}^N c_{k, l} a^k(a^*)^l$ for all $p(z, \overline{z}) = \sum_{k,l=0}^N c_{k,l} z^k\overline{z}^l$ with $c_{k,l} \in \C$.

For a sequence of functions $f_n \in C(\sigma(a))$ that converges uniformly on $\sigma(a)$ to a function $f \in C(\sigma(a))$, $f_n(a)$ converges to $f(a)$. For a power series $f(z) = \sum_{n=0}^\infty c_n z^n$, which converges absolutely uniformly on $\sigma(a)$, therefore $f(a) = \sum_{n=0}^\infty c_na^n$ holds.

If $f \in \mathcal{C}(\sigma(a))$ and $g\in \mathcal{ C}(\sigma(f(a)))$, then $(g \circ f)(a) = g(f(a))$ holds for their composition. If $a,b \in \mathcal{A}_N$ are two normal elements with $f(a) = f(b)$ and $g$ is the inverse function of $f$ on both $\sigma(a)$ and $\sigma(b)$, then $a = b$, since $a = (f \circ g) (a) = f(g(a)) = f(g(b)) = (f \circ g) (b) = b$.

The spectral mapping theorem applies: $\sigma(f(a)) = f(\sigma(a))$ for all $f \in C(\sigma(a))$.

If $ab = ba$ holds for $b \in \mathcal{A}$, then $f(a)b = bf(a)$ also holds for all $f \in C ( \sigma (a))$, i.e. if $b$ commutates with $a$, then also with the corresponding elements of the continuous functional calculus $f(a)$.

Let $\Psi \colon \mathcal{A} \rightarrow \mathcal{B}$ be an unital *-homomorphism between C*-algebras $\mathcal{A}$ and $\mathcal{B}$. Then $\Psi$ commutates with the continuous functional calculus. The following holds: $\Psi(f(a)) = f(\Psi(a))$ for all $f \in C(\sigma(a))$. In particular, the continuous functional calculus commutates with the Gelfand representation.

With the spectral mapping theorem, functions with certain properties can be directly related to certain properties of elements of C*-algebras:

- $f(a)$ is invertible if and only if $f$ has no zero on $\sigma(a)$. Then $f(a)^{-1} = \tfrac{1}{f} (a)$ holds.
- $f(a)$ is self-adjoint if and only if $f$ is real-valued, i.e. $f(\sigma(a)) \subseteq \R$.
- $f(a)$ is positive ($f(a) \geq 0$) if and only if $f \geq 0$, i.e. $f(\sigma(a)) \subseteq [0,\infty )$.
- $f(a)$ is unitary if all values of $f$ lie in the circle group, i.e. $f(\sigma(a)) \subseteq \mathbb{T} = \{ \lambda \in \C \mid \left\| \lambda \right\| = 1 \}$.
- $f(a)$ is a projection if $f$ only takes on the values $0$ and $1$, i.e. $f(\sigma(a)) \subseteq \{ 0, 1 \}$.

These are based on statements about the spectrum of certain elements, which are shown in the Applications section.

In the special case that $\mathcal{A}$ is the C*-algebra of bounded operators $\mathcal{B}(H)$ for a Hilbert space $H$, eigenvectors $v \in H$ for the eigenvalue $\lambda \in \sigma(T)$ of a normal operator $T \in \mathcal{B}(H)$ are also eigenvectors for the eigenvalue $f(\lambda) \in \sigma(f(T))$ of the operator $f(T)$. If $Tv = \lambda v$, then $f(T)v = f(\lambda)v$ also holds for all $f \in \sigma(T)$.

== Applications ==
The following applications are typical and very simple examples of the numerous applications of the continuous functional calculus:

=== Spectrum ===
Let $\mathcal{A}$ be a C*-algebra and $a \in \mathcal{A}_N$ a normal element. Then the following applies to the spectrum $\sigma(a)$:

- $a$ is self-adjoint if and only if $\sigma(a) \subseteq \R$.
- $a$ is unitary if and only if $\sigma(a) \subseteq \mathbb{T} = \{ \lambda \in \C \mid \left\| \lambda \right\| = 1 \}$.
- $a$ is a projection if and only if $\sigma(a) \subseteq \{ 0, 1 \}$.

Proof. The continuous functional calculus $\Phi_a$ for the normal element $a \in \mathcal{A}$ is a *-homomorphism with $\Phi_a (\operatorname{Id}) = a$ and thus $a$ is self-adjoint/unitary/a projection if $\operatorname{Id} \in C( \sigma(a))$ is also self-adjoint/unitary/a projection. Exactly then $\operatorname{Id}$ is self-adjoint if $z = \text{Id}(z) = \overline{\text{Id}}(z) = \overline{z}$ holds for all $z \in \sigma(a)$, i.e. if $\sigma(a)$ is real. Exactly then $\text{Id}$ is unitary if $1 = \text{Id}(z) \overline{\operatorname{Id}}(z) = z \overline{z} = |z|^2$ holds for all $z \in \sigma(a)$, therefore $\sigma(a) \subseteq \{ \lambda \in \C \ | \ \left\| \lambda \right\| = 1 \}$. Exactly then $\text{Id}$ is a projection if and only if $(\operatorname{Id}(z))^2 = \operatorname{Id}}(z) = \overline{\operatorname{Id}(z)$, that is $z^2 = z = \overline{z}$ for all $z \in \sigma(a)$, i.e. $\sigma(a) \subseteq \{ 0,1 \}$

=== Roots ===
Let $a$ be a positive element of a C*-algebra $\mathcal{A}$. Then for every $n \in \mathbb{N}$ there exists a uniquely determined positive element $b \in \mathcal{A}_+$ with $b^n =a$, i.e. a unique $n$-th root.

Proof. For each $n \in \mathbb{N}$, the root function $f_n \colon \R_0^+ \to \R_0^+, x \mapsto \sqrt[n]x$ is a continuous function on $\sigma (a) \subseteq \R_0^+$. If $b \; \colon = f_n (a)$ is defined using the continuous functional calculus, then $b^n = (f_n(a))^n = (f_n^n)(a) = \operatorname{Id}_{\sigma(a)}(a)=a$ follows from the properties of the calculus. From the spectral mapping theorem follows $\sigma(b) = \sigma(f_n(a)) = f_n(\sigma(a)) \subseteq [0,\infty)$, i.e. $b$ is positive. If $c \in \mathcal{A}_+$ is another positive element with $c^n = a = b^n$, then $c = f_n (c^n) = f_n(b^n) = b$ holds, as the root function on the positive real numbers is an inverse function to the function $z \mapsto z^n$.

If $a \in \mathcal{A}_{sa}$ is a self-adjoint element, then at least for every odd $n \in \N$ there is a uniquely determined self-adjoint element $b \in \mathcal{A}_{sa}$ with $b^n = a$.

Similarly, for a positive element $a$ of a C*-algebra $\mathcal{A}$, each $\alpha \geq 0$ defines a uniquely determined positive element $a^\alpha$ of $C^*(a)$, such that $a^\alpha a^\beta = a^{\alpha + \beta}$ holds for all $\alpha, \beta \geq 0$. If $a$ is invertible, this can also be extended to negative values of $\alpha$.

=== Absolute value ===
If $a \in \mathcal{A}$, then the element $a^*a$ is positive, so that the absolute value can be defined by the continuous functional calculus $|a| = \sqrt{a^*a}$, since it is continuous on the positive real numbers.

Let $a$ be a self-adjoint element of a C*-algebra $\mathcal{A}$, then there exist positive elements $a_+,a_- \in \mathcal{A}_+$, such that $a = a_+ - a_-$ with $a_+ a_- = a_- a_+ = 0$ holds. The elements $a_+$ and $a_-$ are also referred to as the positive and negative parts. In addition, $|a| = a_+ + a_-$ holds.

Proof. The functions $f_+(z) = \max(z,0)$ and $f_-(z) = -\min(z, 0)$ are continuous functions on $\sigma(a) \subseteq \R$ with $\operatorname{Id} (z) = z = f_+(z) -f_-(z)$ and $f_+(z)f_-(z) = f_-(z)f_+(z) = 0$. Put $a_+ = f_+(a)$ and $a_- = f_-(a)$. According to the spectral mapping theorem, $a_+$ and $a_-$ are positive elements for which $a = \operatorname{Id}(a) = (f_+ - f_-) (a) = f_+(a) - f_-(a) = a_+ - a_-$ and $a_+ a_- = f_+(a)f_-(a) = (f_+f_-)(a) = 0 = (f_-f_+)(a) = f_-(a)f_+(a) = a_- a_+$ holds. Furthermore, $f_+(z) + f_-(z) = |z| = \sqrt{z^* z} = \sqrt{z^2}$, such that $a_+ + a_- = f_+(a) + f_-(a) = |a| = \sqrt{a^* a} = \sqrt{a^2}$ holds.

=== Unitary elements ===
If $a$ is a self-adjoint element of a C*-algebra $\mathcal{A}$ with unit element $e$, then $u = \mathrm{e}^{\mathrm{i} a}$ is unitary, where $\mathrm{i}$ denotes the imaginary unit. Conversely, if $u \in \mathcal{A}_U$ is a unitary element, with the restriction that the spectrum is a proper subset of the unit circle, i.e. $\sigma(u) \subsetneq \mathbb{T}$, there exists a self-adjoint element $a \in \mathcal{A}_{sa}$ with $u = \mathrm{e}^{\mathrm{i} a}$.

Proof. It is $u = f(a)$ with $f \colon \R \to \C,\ x \mapsto \mathrm{e}^{\mathrm{i}x}$, since $a$ is self-adjoint, it follows that $\sigma(a) \subset \R$, i.e. $f$ is a function on the spectrum of $a$. Since $f\cdot \overline{f} = \overline{f}\cdot f = 1$, using the functional calculus $uu^* = u^*u = e$ follows, i.e. $u$ is unitary. Since for the other statement there is a $z_0 \in \mathbb{T}$, such that $\sigma(u) \subseteq \{ \mathrm{e}^{\mathrm{i} z} \mid z_0 \leq z \leq z_0 + 2 \pi \}$ the function $f(\mathrm{e}^{\mathrm{i} z}) = z$ is a real-valued continuous function on the spectrum $\sigma(u)$ for $z_0 \leq z \leq z_0 + 2 \pi$, such that $a = f(u)$ is a self-adjoint element that satisfies $\mathrm{e}^{\mathrm{i} a} = \mathrm{e}^{\mathrm{i} f(u)} = u$.

=== Spectral decomposition theorem ===
Let $\mathcal{A}$ be an unital C*-algebra and $a \in \mathcal{A}_N$ a normal element. Let the spectrum consist of $n$ pairwise disjoint closed subsets $\sigma_k \subset \C$ for all $1 \leq k \leq n$, i.e. $\sigma(a)=\sigma_1 \sqcup \cdots \sqcup \sigma_n$. Then there exist projections $p_1, \ldots, p_n \in \mathcal{A}$ that have the following properties for all $1 \leq j,k \leq n$:

- For the spectrum, $\sigma(p_k) = \sigma_k$ holds.
- The projections commutate with $a$, i.e. $p_ka=ap_k$.
- The projections are orthogonal, i.e. $p_jp_k=\delta_{jk} p_k$.
- The sum of the projections is the unit element, i.e. $\sum_{k=1}^n p_k = e$.

In particular, there is a decomposition $a = \sum_{k=1}^n a_k$ for which $\sigma(a_k) = \sigma_k$ holds for all $1 \leq k \leq n$.

Proof. Since all $\sigma_k$ are closed, the characteristic functions $\chi_{\sigma_k}$ are continuous on $\sigma(a)$. Now let $p_k := \chi_{\sigma_k} (a)$ be defined using the continuous functional. As the $\sigma_k$ are pairwise disjoint, $\chi_{\sigma_j} \chi_{\sigma_k} = \delta_{jk} \chi_{\sigma_k}$ and $\sum_{k=1}^n \chi_{\sigma_k} = \chi_{\cup_{k=1}^n \sigma_k} = \chi_{\sigma(a)} = \textbf{1}$ holds and thus the $p_k$ satisfy the claimed properties, as can be seen from the properties of the continuous functional equation. For the last statement, let $a_k = a p_k = \operatorname{Id} (a) \cdot \chi_{\sigma_k} (a) = (\operatorname{Id} \cdot \chi_{\sigma_k}) (a)$.
