= Henry Dye =

American mathematician

- Born: February 14, 1926; Dunkirk, New York, US
- Died: November 26, 1986 (aged 60); Los Angeles, California, US
- Education: Rensselaer Polytechnic Institute; University of Chicago
- Known for: Dye's orbit equivalence theorem Russo–Dye theorem
- Scientific career
- Fields: Mathematics
- Workplaces: Caltech; University of Iowa; University of Southern California; UCLA
- Thesis: Radon-Nikodym Theorems for Operator Algebras (1950)
- Doctoral advisor: Irving Segal
- Doctoral students: William Arveson

Henry Abel Dye Jr. (1926–1986) was an American mathematician, specializing in operator algebras and ergodic theory.

== Education and career ==
Dye received from Rensselaer Polytechnic Institute a bachelor's degree and in 1950 a Ph.D. from the University of Chicago. As a postdoc he was from 1950 to 1952 at California Institute of Technology (Caltech) and from 1952 to 1953 at the Institute for Advanced Study. He was from 1953 to 1956 an assistant professor at the University of Iowa, from 1956 to 1959 an associate professor at the University of Southern California (USC), and from 1959 to 1960 a full professor at the University of Iowa. From 1960 until his death in 1986 he was a full professor at the University of California, Los Angeles (UCLA).

His first published paper, "The Radon-Nikodym theorem for finite rings of operators", contained important results which led to many advances in the theory of von Neumann algebras, for example, the non-commutative integration theory of I.E. Segal and J. Dixmier and the modular theory of von Neumann algebras. In other papers concerning operator algebras, he showed that the unitary group and the projection lattice of a von Neumann factor each completely determine the algebraic structure of that factor.

One of the most striking early results of Murray and von Neumann implied that all finite measure preserving actions of countable abelian groups give rise to isomorphic operator algebras. It was Henry Dye who discovered that this isomorphism had a more fundamental and geometric origin, and was actually induced by an isomorphism of the underlying measure spaces that carried orbits to orbits.

== Selected publications ==
- Dye, H. A. (1952). "The Radon-Nikodym theorem for finite rings of operators". Trans. Amer. Math. Soc. 72 (2): 243–280. doi:10.2307/1990754. JSTOR 1990754.
- Dye, H. A. (1953). "The unitary structure in finite rings of operators". Duke Mathematical Journal. 20 (1): 55–69. doi:10.1215/S0012-7094-53-02006-7.
- Dye, H. A. (1955). "On the geometry of projections in certain operator algebras". Annals of Mathematics. 61 (1): 73–89. doi:10.2307/1969620. JSTOR 1969620.
- Dye, H. A. (1959). "On groups of measure preserving transformations I". American Journal of Mathematics. 81 (1): 119–159. doi:10.2307/2372852. JSTOR 2372852.
- Dye, H. A. (1963). "On groups of measure preserving transformations II". American Journal of Mathematics. 85 (4): 551–576. doi:10.2307/2373108. JSTOR 2373108.
- Dye, H. A. (1965). "On the ergodic mixing theorem". Trans. Amer. Math. Soc. 118: 123–130. doi:10.1090/s0002-9947-1965-0174705-8. JSTOR 1993948.
- with Bernard Russo: Russo, B.; Dye, H. A. (1966). "A Note on Unitary Operators in C*-Algebras". Duke Mathematical Journal. 33 (2): 413–416. doi:10.1215/S0012-7094-66-03346-1.
