= Functional calculus =

Theory allowing one to apply mathematical functions to mathematical operators

In mathematics, a functional calculus is a theory allowing one to apply mathematical functions to mathematical operators. It is now a branch (more accurately, several related areas) of the field of functional analysis, connected with spectral theory. Historically, the term was synonymous with the calculus of variations; the latter term remains in extensive use in physics and engineering texts, whereas functional calculus develops the subject further with more mathematically careful, formal, abstract and precise articulations. The older usage is still visible in the functional derivative, which is often called the variational derivative.

== Usage ==
There are several unrelated uses of the term "functional calculus": it is sometimes applied to types of functional equations, and sometimes to systems of logic in predicate calculus.

Some of the areas of mathematics that fall under the term "functional calculus" include:

- The operational calculus, a technique for solving differential equations by converting them into polynomial equations. The central idea is to view integration and differentiation as operators in their own right; differential equations then appear to have the algebraic form of polynomials in these operators.
- Holomorphic functional calculus, which attempts to extend the techniques commonly used to study holomorphic functions $f(z)$ to expressions $f(T)$ where $T$ is a matrix or linear operator. This includes the special case where $f(z)$ is a polynomial, leading to the "polynomial functional calculus".
- Continuous functional calculus, which considers the application of continuous functions $f(x)$ to the normal elements of a C*-algebra. The ability to do this is the primary distinguishing feature that singles out the C*-algebras as a subset of Banach algebras, which support only the holomorphic functional calculus. The C*-algebras were originally developed to explore and formalize the operator equations being developed for quantum mechanics, specifically for matrix mechanics. The defining characteristics of quantum mechanics included the idea that the operators acted on Hilbert spaces, that there is a norm that expresses the expectation value of an operator, and that complex conjugation is an involution, expressing the adjoint of an operator, thus forming a *-algebra.
- Borel functional calculus, which generalizes the continuous functional calculus by considering any Borel function applied to an operator from a commutative algebra. For example, the Borel functional calculus can rigorously define the "square root" of the (negative) Laplacian operator $-\Delta$ or the exponential $e^{it \Delta}.$

== Informal motivation ==
The techniques developed for the calculus of variations provide the motivation for the general development of functional calculus. For example, if $f(x)$ is a polynomial in $x$, and $T$ is a matrix or a linear operator, one might consider the expression $f(T)$. To give this precise meaning, one must tackle issues of convergence, compactness, boundedness and continuity.

In the finite-dimensional case, the polynomial functional calculus yields quite a bit of information about the operator. For example, consider the family of polynomials which annihilates an operator $T$. This family is an ideal in the ring of polynomials. Furthermore, it is a nontrivial ideal: let $N$ be the finite dimension of the algebra of matrices, then $\{I, T, T^2, \ldots, T^N \}$ is linearly dependent. So $\sum_{i=0}^N \alpha_i T^i = 0$ for some scalars $\alpha_i$, not all equal to 0. This implies that the polynomial $\sum_{i=0}^N \alpha_i x^i$ lies in the ideal. Since the ring of polynomials is a principal ideal domain, this ideal is generated by some polynomial $m$. Multiplying by a unit if necessary, we can choose $m$ to be monic. When this is done, the polynomial $m$ is precisely the minimal polynomial of $T$. This polynomial gives deep information about $T$. For instance, a scalar $\alpha$ is an eigenvalue of $T$ if and only if $\alpha$ is a root of $m$. Also, sometimes $m$ can be used to calculate the exponential of $T$ efficiently.

The polynomial calculus is not as informative in the infinite-dimensional case. Consider the unilateral shift with the polynomials calculus; the ideal defined above is now trivial. Thus one is interested in functional calculi more general than polynomials. The subject is closely linked to spectral theory, since for a diagonal matrix or multiplication operator, it is rather clear what the definitions should be.

== See also ==
- Direct integral – Generalization of the concept of a direct sum in mathematics
