= Paul Sally =

American mathematician (1933–2013)

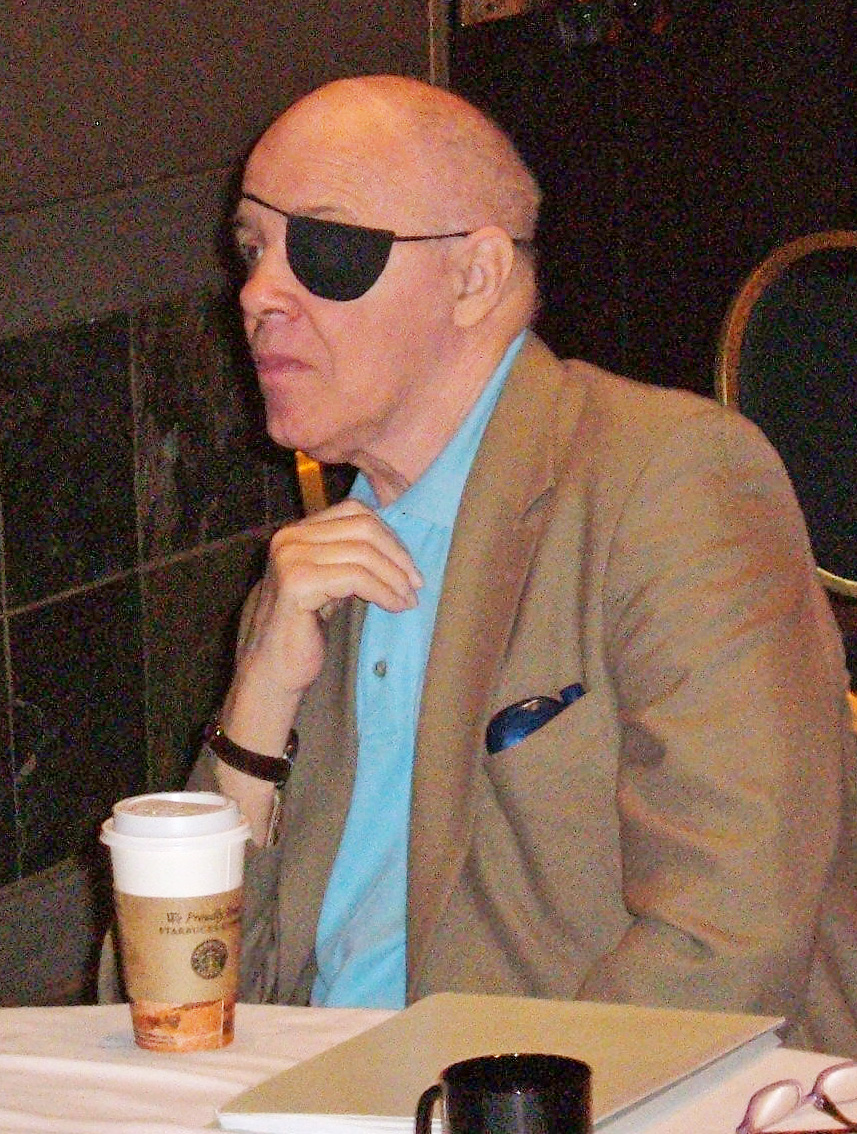
- Paul Sally in 2008
- Born: Paul Joseph Sally Jr. January 29, 1933; Roslindale, Boston, Massachusetts, U.S.
- Died: December 30, 2013 (aged 80); Chicago, Illinois, U.S.
- Education: Boston College (BS, MS); Brandeis University (PhD)
- Spouse: Judith D. Sally
- Scientific career
- Institutions: University of Chicago
- Doctoral advisor: Ray Kunze

Paul Joseph Sally Jr. (January 29, 1933 – December 30, 2013) was a professor of mathematics at the University of Chicago, where he was the director of undergraduate studies for 30 years. His research areas were p-adic analysis and representation theory.

== Life and education ==
Sally was born in the Roslindale neighborhood of Boston, Massachusetts on January 29, 1933. He was a star basketball player at Boston College High School. He received his BS and MS degrees from Boston College in 1954 and 1956.

After a short career in Boston area high schools and at Boston College, he entered the first class of mathematics graduate students at Brandeis in 1957, and earned his PhD in 1965. During his graduate career he married Judith D. Sally and had three children in three years. David, the oldest, is a Visiting Associate Professor of Business Administration at Tuck School of Business at Dartmouth College, Stephen is a partner at White & Case (previously Ropes & Gray), and Paul, the youngest, is Superintendent at New Trier High School.

Sally was diagnosed with type 1 diabetes in 1948. The condition resulted in his use of an eye patch and two prosthetic legs, which caused him to be widely referred to as "Professor Pirate," and "The Math Pirate" around the University of Chicago campus. He was known to detest cell phones in class and destroyed several over the years by inviting students to stomp on them or by throwing them out of a window.

== Career ==
Sally joined the University of Chicago faculty in 1965 and taught there until his death. He was a member of the Institute for Advanced Study from 1967–68, 1971–72, 1981–82, and 1983–84.

While at the IAS he collaborated with Joseph Shalika. In 1983, he became the first director of the University of Chicago School Mathematics Project, which is responsible for the Everyday Mathematics program (also called "Chicago math").

He founded Seminars for Elementary Specialists and Mathematics Educators (SESAME) in 1992. He co-founded the Young Scholars Program with Dr. Diane Herrmann in 1988, providing mathematical enrichment for gifted Chicago-area students in grades 7–12.

== Death ==
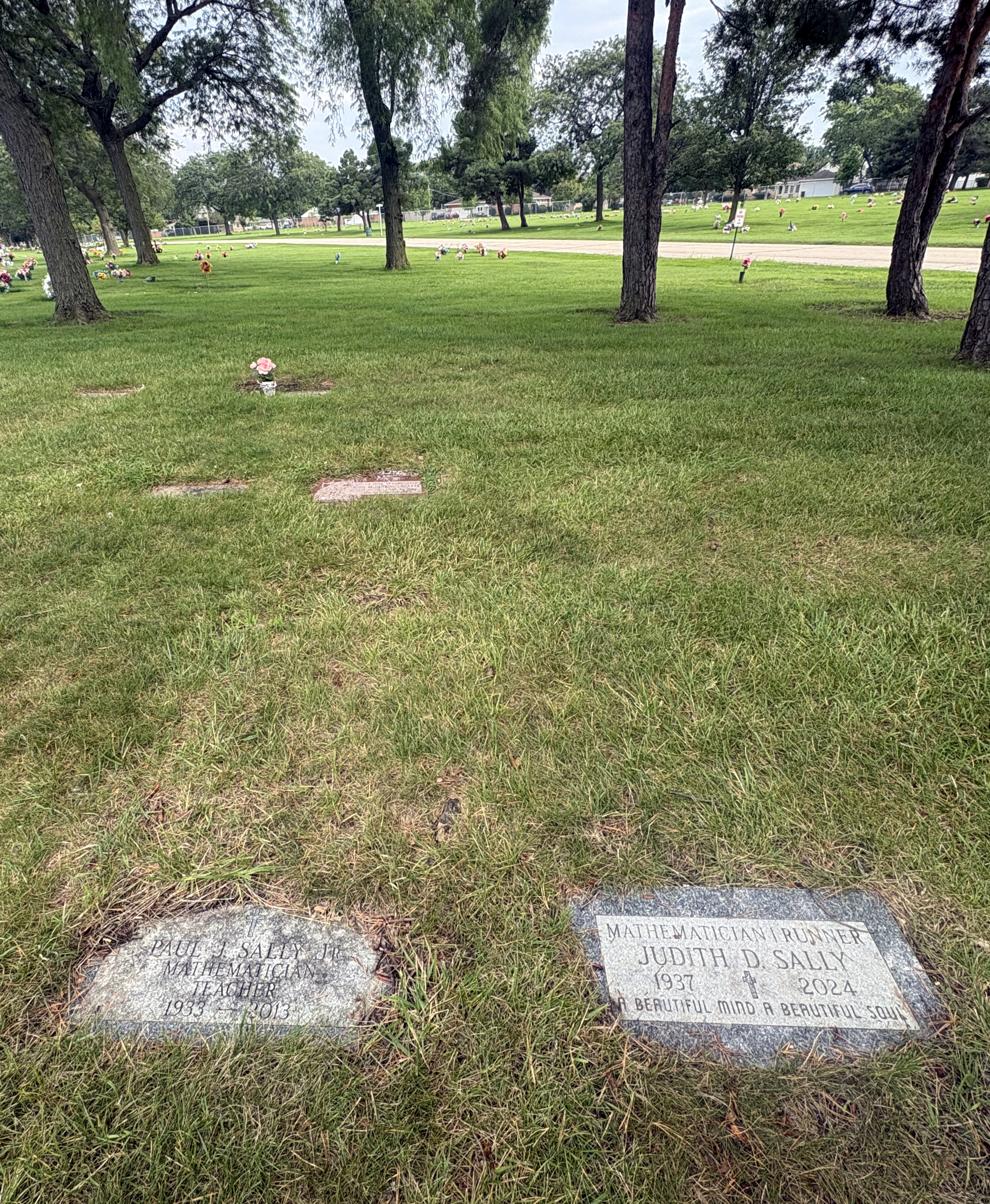
Graves of Paul and Judith Sally at Maryhill Catholic Cemetery

Sally died December 30, 2013, aged 80, from congestive heart failure, at the University of Chicago Hospital, and was buried at Maryhill Catholic Cemetery in Niles, Illinois.

== Awards ==
- Amoco Foundation Award for Long-Term Excellence in Undergraduate Teaching, 1995
- American Mathematical Society Distinguished Service Award, 2000
- One of the Deborah and Franklin Haimo Awards for Distinguished College or University Teaching of Mathematics of the Mathematical Association of America, 2002
- Fellow of the American Mathematical Society, 2012.

== Selected publications ==
- Sally, P.J. Jr.; Shalika, J.A. (1968). "Characters of the discrete series of representations of SL(2) over a local field". Proceedings of the National Academy of Sciences of the United States of America. 61 (4). Proc. Natl. Acad. Sci. U.S.A.: 1231–1237. Bibcode:1968PNAS...61.1231S. doi:10.1073/pnas.61.4.1231. PMC 225245. PMID 16591722.
- Sally, Judith (2003). Trimathlon: A Workout Beyond the School Curriculum. AK Peters, Ltd. ISBN 978-1-56881-184-0.
- Sally, Paul J. Jr.; Herrmann, Diane L. (2004). Number, Shape and Symmetry: an Introduction to Mathematics. Pacific Grove: Brooks Cole. ISBN 0-534-40539-8.
- Sally, Paul J. Jr.; Herrmann, Diane L. (2005). Number Theory and Geometry for College Students. Pacific Grove: Brooks Cole. ISBN 0-534-40536-3.
- Sally, Judith (2007). Roots to Research: A Vertical Development of Mathematical Problems. Providence, RI: American Mathematical Society. ISBN 978-0-8218-4403-8.
- Sally, Paul J. Jr. (2008). Tools of the Trade: Introduction to Advanced Mathematics. Providence, RI: American Mathematical Society. ISBN 978-0-8218-4634-6.
- Sally, Paul J. Jr. (2013). Fundamentals of Mathematical Analysis. Providence, RI: American Mathematical Society. ISBN 978-0-8218-9141-4.
