= Ray Kunze =

American mathematician

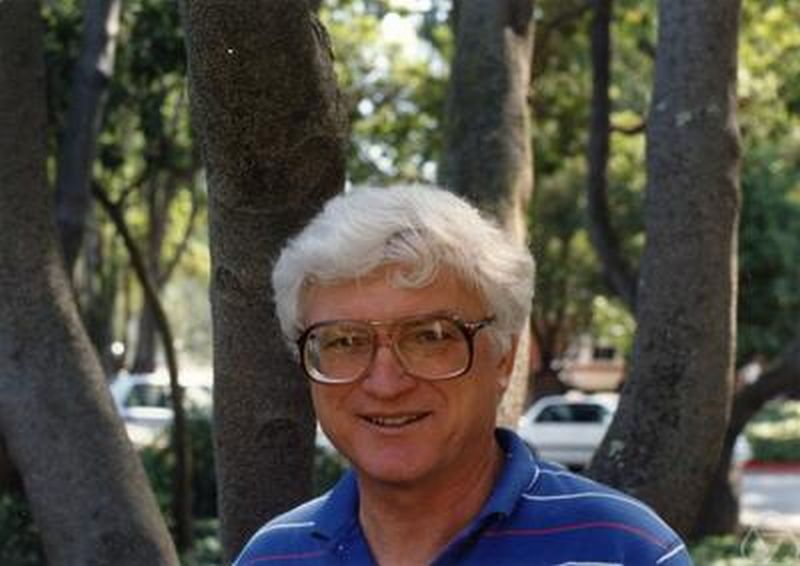
- Kunze in Berkeley, 1989
- Born: March 7, 1928; Des Moines, Iowa
- Died: May 21, 2014 (aged 86)
- Education: University of Chicago (PhD, 1957)
- Scientific career
- Fields: Mathematics
- Thesis: Lsubp Fourier Transformations on Locally Compact Unimodular Groups (1957)
- Doctoral advisor: Irving Ezra Segal
- Doctoral students: Paul Sally; Kenneth Gross

Ray Alden Kunze (March 7, 1928 – May 21, 2014) was an American mathematician who chaired the mathematics departments at the University of California, Irvine and the University of Georgia. His mathematical research concerned the representation theory of groups and noncommutative harmonic analysis.

Kunze was born in Des Moines, Iowa and grew up near Milwaukee, Wisconsin. He began his undergraduate studies at Denison University but transferred to the University of Chicago after two years, and earned bachelor's and master's degrees in mathematics. After working as a military mathematical analyst, he returned to the University of Chicago, and earned his Ph.D. in 1957 with a dissertation on Fourier transformations supervised by Irving Segal. As well as his positions at UCI and Georgia, he also worked at the Institute for Advanced Study, Massachusetts Institute of Technology, Brandeis University, and Washington University in St. Louis. He has over 50 academic descendants, many of them through his students Paul Sally at Brandeis and Edward N. Wilson at Washington University.

With his advisor Irving Segal, Kunze was the author of the textbook Integrals and Operators (McGraw-Hill, 1968; 2nd ed., Grundlehren der Mathematischen Wissenschaften 228, Springer, 1978). With Kenneth M. Hoffman he was the author of Linear Algebra (Prentice-Hall, 1961; 2nd ed., Pearson, 1971).

In 1994, a special session on representation theory and harmonic analysis was held in honor of Kunze as part of the 889th meeting of the American Mathematical Society, and the papers from the session were published as a festschrift. In 2012, Kunze was recognized as one of the inaugural fellows of the American Mathematical Society.
