= Judith D. Sally =

American mathematician (1937–2024)

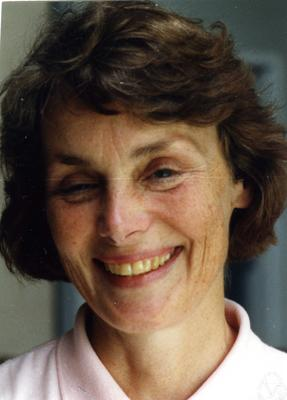
- Photo taken in 1981 by Jürgen Herzog
- Born: March 23, 1937; Manhattan, New York, U.S.
- Died: January 28, 2024 (aged 86); Chicago, Illinois, U.S.
- Education: University of Chicago
- Known for: Commutative algebra
- Spouse: Paul Sally
- Awards: AWM Noether Lecturer (1995)
- Scientific career
- Fields: Mathematics
- Institutions: Northwestern University
- Doctoral advisor: Irving Kaplansky

Judith Donovan Sally (born Judith Donovan; March 23, 1937 – January 28, 2024) was an American mathematician who was Professor Emeritus of Mathematics at Northwestern University. Her research was in commutative algebra, particularly in the study of Noetherian local rings and graded rings.

== Biography ==
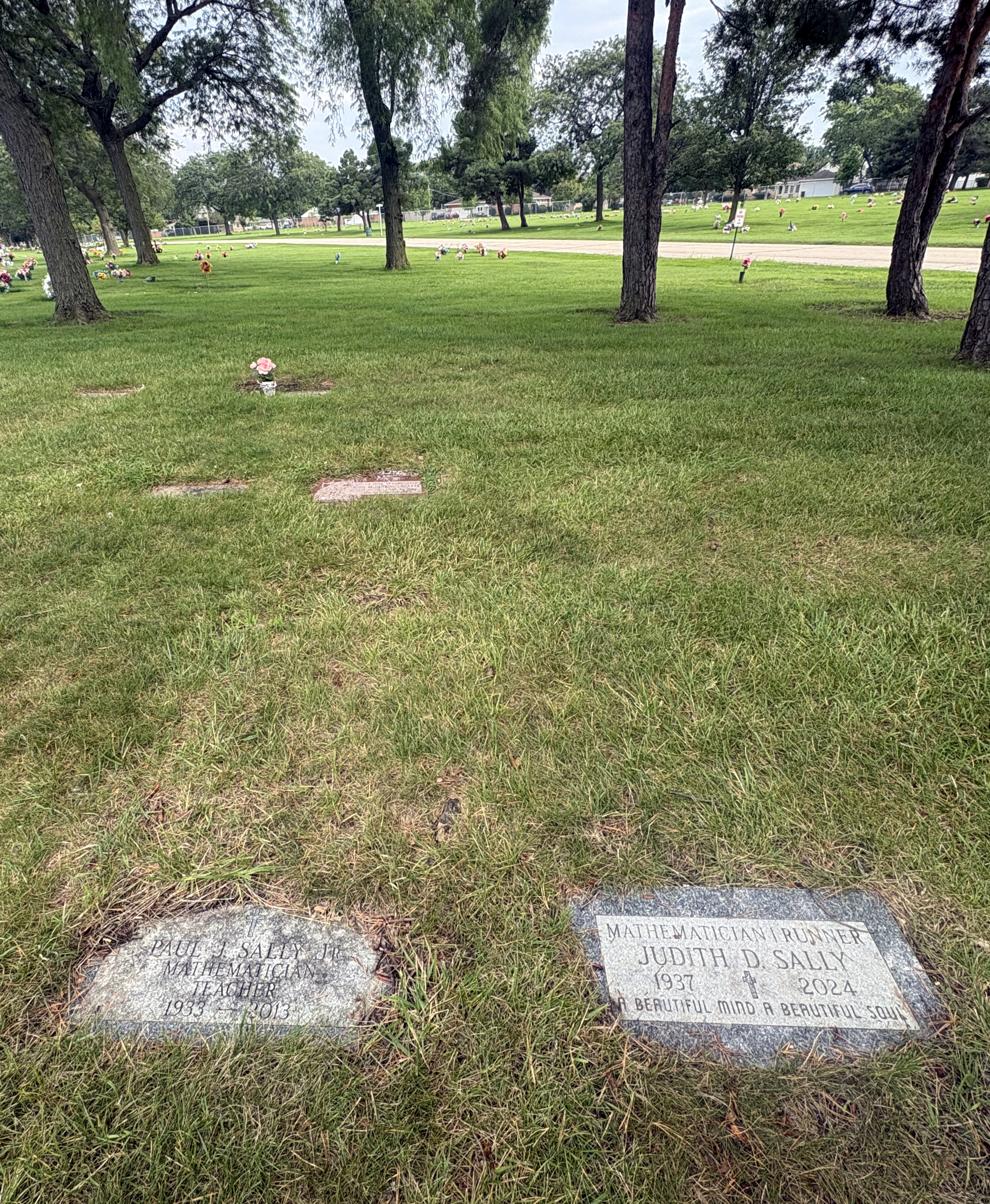
Graves of Paul and Judith Sally at Maryhill Catholic Cemetery

Judith Donovan was born to Dr. and Mrs. Edward J. Donovan in Manhattan, New York on March 23, 1937. She finished high school at the Convent of Sacred Heart in New York and pursued her undergraduate studies at Barnard College, earning her bachelor's degree in 1958. After graduating from Barnard, she began graduate studies in mathematics at Brandeis University in Waltham, Massachusetts. At Brandeis, she met Paul J. Sally, Jr, who was in the doctoral program in mathematics at Brandeis. Judith and Paul were married in November 1959, while Paul was still in graduate school. In 1960, Judith Sally was awarded a master's degree in mathematics from Brandeis. Judith and Paul had three sons, David, Stephen, and Paul III, while Paul was completing his dissertation and consequently, Judith postponed her doctoral studies. Paul completed his Ph.D. at Brandeis in 1965 and joined the faculty at the University of Chicago that same year.

In 1968, Sally entered the doctoral program in mathematics at Chicago. In 1971, she was awarded her Ph.D. in mathematics from University of Chicago. Her thesis "Regular Overrings of Regular Local Rings" was supervised by Irving Kaplansky.

Sally was an accomplished runner, completing several Chicago Marathons, as well as many shorter races, where she often finished first in her age group. She died in Chicago on January 28, 2024, at the age of 86, and was buried at Maryhill Catholic Cemetery in Niles, Illinois.

== Career ==
After completion of her doctoral studies, Sally spent 1971–1972 in a postdoctoral position at Rutgers University in New Brunswick, New Jersey. Sally joined the faculty at Northwestern University in 1972. In 1977, she received a Sloan Fellowship. She received a Bunting Fellowship at the Mary Ingraham Institute at Radcliffe College for the 1981–1982 academic year. In 1982, she became the second woman to be appointed a full professor in mathematics at Northwestern, after Alexandra Bellow. Sally was awarded a National Science Foundation Visiting Professorship for Women for the 1988–1989 academic year, during which time she visited Purdue University in West Lafayette, Indiana. At Northwestern she won the College of Arts and Sciences Teaching Award. In 1995, she was invited to give the Association for Women in Mathematics Noether Lecture, an honor "for fundamental and sustained contributions to the mathematical sciences".

Sally also wrote a research monograph Number of generators of ideals in rings that was published by Marcel Dekker in 1978, and translated Jean Dieudonné's Cours de géométrie algébrique into English as History of algebraic geometry. She published several books on mathematics education with her husband, Paul Sally. Her interest in mathematical pedagogy also led to teaching mathematics courses at the University of Chicago for historically underrepresented groups and geometry courses for elementary school teachers.

== Selected publications ==
- Sally, Judith (1978). Numbers of generators of ideals in local rings. New York: M. Dekker. ISBN 0-8247-6645-8. MR 0485852.
- Sally, Judith D. (1977). "On the associated graded ring of a local Cohen-Macaulay ring". J. Math. Kyoto Univ. 17 (1): 19–21. MR 0943272.
- Huneke, Craig; Sally, Judith D. (1988). "Birational extensions in dimension two and integrally closed ideals". J. Algebra. 115 (2): 481–500. doi:10.1016/0021-8693(88)90274-8. MR 0943272.
- Sally, Judith; Sally, Paul (2003). Trimathlon: A Workout Beyond the School Curriculum. AK Peters, Ltd. ISBN 978-1-56881-184-0.
- Sally, Judith D.; Sally, Paul J. (2007). Roots to Research: A Vertical Development of Mathematical Problems. Providence: American Mathematical Society. ISBN 978-0-8218-4403-8. MR 2359908.
