= Russo–Dye theorem =

In mathematics, the Russo–Dye theorem is a result in the field of functional analysis. It states that in a unital C*-algebra, the closure of the convex hull of the unitary elements is the closed unit ball. The theorem was published by B. Russo and H. A. Dye in 1966.

== Other formulations and generalizations ==
Results similar to the Russo–Dye theorem hold in more general contexts. For example, in a unital *-Banach algebra, the closed unit ball is contained in the closed convex hull of the unitary elements.

A more precise result is true for the C*-algebra of all bounded linear operators on a Hilbert space: If T is such an operator and ||T|| < 1 − 2/n for some integer n > 2, then T is the mean of n unitary operators.

== Applications ==
This example is due to Russo & Dye, Corollary 1: If U(A) denotes the unitary elements of a C*-algebra A, then the norm of a linear mapping f from A to a normed linear space B is

$$\sup_{U \in U(A)} ||f(U)||.$$

In other words, the norm of an operator can be calculated using only the unitary elements of the algebra.
