= Kenneth I. Gross =

American mathematician

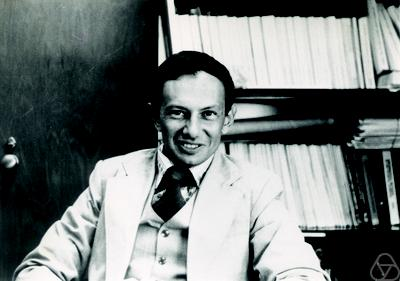
- Born: October 14, 1938; Malden, Massachusetts
- Died: September 10, 2017 (aged 78); Colchester, VT
- Education: Brandeis University (BS, 1960; MS, 1962); Washington University in St. Louis (PhD 1966)
- Spouse: Mary Lou Gross
- Children: 2
- Scientific career
- Institutions: Tulane University: Dartmouth College; University of North Carolina; University of Wyoming; University of Vermont; Lesley University
- Thesis: Plancherel Transform of the Nilpotent Part of G2 and Applications to the Representation Theory of G2 (1966)
- Academic advisors: Ray Alden Kunze

Kenneth Irwin Gross (14 October 1938 – 10 September 2017) was an American mathematician.

Born in Malden, Massachusetts in 1938, Gross received from Brandeis University his bachelor's degree in 1960 and his master's degree in 1962. He received his Ph.D. in 1966 from Washington University in St. Louis under Ray Kunze with thesis Plancherel Transform of the Nilpotent Part of $G_2$ and Some Applications to the Representation Theory of $G_2$. He was an assistant professor from 1966 to 1968 at Tulane University and an assistant professor from 1968 to 1973 at Dartmouth College. He became in 1973 an associate professor and eventually a full professor at the University of North Carolina before resigning in 1981. From 1981 to 1985 he was the chair of the mathematics department of the University of Wyoming. In 1988 Gross became a professor at the University of Vermont, where he served as chair of the department of mathematics and statistics from 1988 to 1992. On a leave of absence he was for two years (2003–2005) at Lesley University, where he developed the mathematics program.

Gross has been a visiting professor at the University of California, Irvine, the University of Utah, the Academia Sinica in Taiwan, Drexel University, Macquarie University, and Australia's University of Newcastle. He has twice served as a divisional program director for the National Science Foundation. He was the director of the Vermont Mathematics Initiative.

He did research on harmonic analysis, group representation theory, analysis on Lie groups and homogeneous spaces, special functions, Fourier analysis, and mathematical applications to physics and multivariate statistics.

In 1979 he received the Lester Randolph Ford Award. In 1981 he received the Chauvenet Prize from the Mathematical Association of America. In 2008 he received a Deborah and Franklin Haimo Award for Distinguished College or University Teaching of Mathematics. In 2012 he was elected a Fellow of the American Mathematical Society. He died on 10 September 2017 at the age of 78.

== Selected publications ==
- as editor: The mathematics of energy research, SIAM 1984
- with Donald St. P. Richards: Gross, Kenneth I.; Richards, Donald St. P. (1991). "Hypergeometric functions on complex matrix space". Bull. Amer. Math. Soc. (N.S.). 24 (2): 349–355. doi:10.1090/s0273-0979-1991-16031-3. MR 1071029.
- Harmonic Analysis, Encyclopedia of the History and Philosophy of the Mathematical Sciences, Routledge, 1994, vol. 1, pp. 395–418
- as editor with D.S.P. Richards, P. Sally, T. Ton-That Representation theory and harmonic analysis, Contemporary Mathematics, vol. 191, American Mathematical Society 1995
- editor with R. Ewing, C. Martin: The Merging of Disciplines: New Directions in Pure, Applied, and Computational Mathematics, Springer Verlag 1986
