= Self-adjoint element =

Element of *-algebra where x* equals x

In mathematics, an element of a *-algebra is called self-adjoint if it is the same as its adjoint (i.e. $a = a^*$).

== Definition ==
Let $\mathcal{A}$ be a *-algebra. An element $a \in \mathcal{A}$ is called self-adjoint if $a = a^*$.

The set of self-adjoint elements is referred to as $\mathcal{A}_{sa}$.

A subset $\mathcal{B} \subseteq \mathcal{A}$ that is closed under the involution *, i.e. $\mathcal{B} = \mathcal{B}^*$, is called self-adjoint.

A special case of particular importance is the case where $\mathcal{A}$ is a complete normed *-algebra, that satisfies the C*-identity ($\left\| a^*a \right\| = \left\| a \right\|^2 \ \forall a \in \mathcal{A}$), which is called a C*-algebra.

Especially in the older literature on *-algebras and C*-algebras, such elements are often called hermitian. Because of that the notations $\mathcal{A}_h$, $\mathcal{A}_H$ or $H(\mathcal{A})$ for the set of self-adjoint elements are also sometimes used, even in the more recent literature.

== Examples ==
- Each positive element of a C*-algebra is self-adjoint.
- For each element $a$ of a *-algebra, the elements $aa^*$ and $a^*a$ are self-adjoint, since * is an involutive antiautomorphism.
- For each element $a$ of a *-algebra, the real and imaginary parts $\operatorname{Re}(a) = \frac{1}{2} (a+a^*)$ and $\operatorname{Im}(a) = \frac{1}{2 \mathrm{i} } (a-a^*)$ are self-adjoint, where $\mathrm{i}$ denotes the imaginary unit.
- If $a \in \mathcal{A}_N$ is a normal element of a C*-algebra $\mathcal{A}$, then for every real-valued function $f$, which is continuous on the spectrum of $a$, the continuous functional calculus defines a self-adjoint element $f(a)$.

== Criteria ==
Let $\mathcal{A}$ be a *-algebra. Then:

- Let $a \in \mathcal{A}$, then $a^*a$ is self-adjoint, since $(a^*a)^* = a^*(a^*)^* = a^*a$. A similarly calculation yields that $aa^*$ is also self-adjoint.
- Let $a = a_1 a_2$ be the product of two self-adjoint elements $a_1,a_2 \in \mathcal{A}_{sa}$. Then $a$ is self-adjoint if $a_1$ and $a_2$ commutate, since $(a_1 a_2)^* = a_2^* a_1^* = a_2 a_1$ always holds.
- If $\mathcal{A}$ is a C*-algebra, then a normal element $a \in \mathcal{A}_N$ is self-adjoint if and only if its spectrum is real, i.e. $\sigma(a) \subseteq \R$.

== Properties ==
=== In *-algebras ===
Let $\mathcal{A}$ be a *-algebra. Then:

- Each element $a \in \mathcal{A}$ can be uniquely decomposed into real and imaginary parts, i.e. there are uniquely determined elements $a_1,a_2 \in \mathcal{A}_{sa}$, so that $a = a_1 + \mathrm{i} a_2$ holds. Where $a_1 = \frac{1}{2} (a + a^*)$ and $a_2 = \frac{1}{2 \mathrm{i}} (a - a^*)$.
- The set of self-adjoint elements $\mathcal{A}_{sa}$ is a real linear subspace of $\mathcal{A}$. From the previous property, it follows that $\mathcal{A}$ is the direct sum of two real linear subspaces, i.e. $\mathcal{A} = \mathcal{A}_{sa} \oplus \mathrm{i} \mathcal{A}_{sa}$.
- If $a \in \mathcal{A}_{sa}$ is self-adjoint, then $a$ is normal.
- The *-algebra $\mathcal{A}$ is called a hermitian *-algebra if every self-adjoint element $a \in \mathcal{A}_{sa}$ has a real spectrum $\sigma(a) \subseteq \R$.

=== In C*-algebras ===
Let $\mathcal{A}$ be a C*-algebra and $a \in \mathcal{A}_{sa}$. Then:

- For the spectrum $\left\| a \right\| \in \sigma(a)$ or $-\left\| a \right\| \in \sigma(a)$ holds, since $\sigma(a)$ is real and $r(a) = \left\| a \right\|$ holds for the spectral radius, because $a$ is normal.
- According to the continuous functional calculus, there exist uniquely determined positive elements $a_+,a_- \in \mathcal{A}_+$, such that $a = a_+ - a_-$ with $a_+ a_- = a_- a_+ = 0$. For the norm, $\left\| a \right\| = \max(\left\|a_+\right\|,\left\|a_-\right\|)$ holds. The elements $a_+$ and $a_-$ are also referred to as the positive and negative parts. In addition, $|a| = a_+ + a_-$ holds for the absolute value defined for every element $|a| = (a^* a)^\frac{1}{2}$.
- For every $a \in \mathcal{A}_+$ and odd $n \in \mathbb{N}$, there exists a uniquely determined $b \in \mathcal{A}_+$ that satisfies $b^n = a$, i.e. a unique $n$-th root, as can be shown with the continuous functional calculus.

== See also ==
- Self-adjoint matrix
- Self-adjoint operator
