= Normal element =

In mathematics, an element of a *-algebra is called normal if it commutates with its adjoint.

== Definition ==
Let $\mathcal{A}$ be a *-Algebra. An element $a \in \mathcal{A}$ is called normal if it commutes with $a^*$, i.e. it satisfies the equation $aa^* = a^*a$.

The set of normal elements is denoted by $\mathcal{A}_N$ or $N(\mathcal{A})$.

A special case of particular importance is the case where $\mathcal{A}$ is a complete normed *-algebra, that satisfies the C*-identity ($\left\| a^*a \right\| = \left\| a \right\|^2 \ \forall a \in \mathcal{A}$), which is called a C*-algebra.

== Examples ==
- Every self-adjoint element of a a *-algebra is normal.
- Every unitary element of a a *-algebra is normal.
- If $\mathcal{A}$ is a C*-Algebra and $a \in \mathcal{A}_N$ a normal element, then for every continuous function $f$ on the spectrum of $a$ the continuous functional calculus defines another normal element $f(a)$.

== Criteria ==
Let $\mathcal{A}$ be a *-algebra. Then:

- An element $a \in \mathcal{A}$ is normal if and only if the *-subalgebra generated by $a$, meaning the smallest *-algebra containing $a$, is commutative.
- Every element $a \in \mathcal{A}$ can be uniquely decomposed into a real and imaginary part, which means there exist self-adjoint elements $a_1,a_2 \in \mathcal{A}_{sa}$, such that $a = a_1 + \mathrm{i} a_2$, where $\mathrm{i}$ denotes the imaginary unit. Exactly then $a$ is normal if $a_1 a_2 = a_2 a_1$, i.e. real and imaginary part commutate.

== Properties ==
=== In *-algebras ===
Let $a \in \mathcal{A}_N$ be a normal element of a *-algebra $\mathcal{A}$. Then:

- The adjoint element $a^*$ is also normal, since $a = (a^*)^*$ holds for the involution *.

=== In C*-algebras ===
Let $a \in \mathcal{A}_N$ be a normal element of a C*-algebra $\mathcal{A}$. Then:

- It is $\left\| a^2 \right\| = \left\| a \right\|^2$, since for normal elements using the C*-identity $\left\| a^2 \right\|^2 = \left\| (a^2) (a^2)^* \right\| = \left\| (a^*a)^* (a^*a) \right\| = \left\| a^*a \right\|^2 = \left( \left\| a \right\|^2 \right)^2$ holds.
- Every normal element is a normaloid element, i.e. the spectral radius $r(a)$ equals the norm of $a$, i.e. $r(a)= \left\| a \right\|$. This follows from the spectral radius formula by repeated application of the previous property.
- A continuous functional calculus can be developed which – put simply – allows the application of continuous functions on the spectrum of $a$ to $a$.

== See also ==
- Normal matrix
- Normal operator
