= *-algebra =

Mathematical structure in abstract algebra

In mathematics, and more specifically in abstract algebra, a *-algebra (or involutive algebra; read as "star-algebra") is a mathematical structure consisting of two involutive rings R and A, where R is commutative and A has the structure of an associative algebra over R. Involutive algebras generalize the idea of a number system equipped with conjugation, for example the complex numbers and complex conjugation, matrices over the complex numbers and conjugate transpose, and linear operators over a Hilbert space and Hermitian adjoints. However, it may happen that an algebra admits no involution. (Note: In this context, involution is taken to mean an involutory antiautomorphism, also known as an anti-involution.)

== Definitions ==
=== *-ring ===
In mathematics, a *-ring is a ring A with a map * : A → A that is an antiautomorphism and an involution.

More precisely, * is required to satisfy the following properties:

- (x + y)* = x* + y*
- (x y)* = y* x*
- 1* = 1
- (x*)* = x

for all x, y in A.

This is also called an involutive ring, involutory ring, and ring with involution. The third axiom is implied by the second and fourth axioms, making it redundant.

Elements such that x* = x are called self-adjoint.

Archetypical examples of a *-ring are fields of complex numbers and algebraic numbers with complex conjugation as the involution. One can define a sesquilinear form over any *-ring.

Also, one can define *-versions of algebraic objects, such as ideal and subring, with the requirement to be *-invariant: x ∈ I ⇒ x* ∈ I and so on.

*-rings are unrelated to star semirings in the theory of computation.

=== *-algebra ===
A *-algebra A is a *-ring, (Note: Most definitions do not require a *-algebra to have the unity, i.e. a *-algebra is allowed to be a *-rng only.) with involution * that is an associative algebra over a commutative *-ring R with involution ′, such that (r x)* = r′ x* ∀r ∈ R, x ∈ A.

The base *-ring R is often the complex numbers (with ′ acting as complex conjugation).

It follows from the axioms that * on A is conjugate-linear in R, meaning

(λ x + μ y)* = λ′ x* + μ′ y*

for λ, μ ∈ R, x, y ∈ A.

A *-homomorphism f : A → B is an algebra homomorphism that is compatible with the involutions of A and B, i.e.,

- f(a*) = f(a)* for all a in A.

=== Philosophy of the *-operation ===
The *-operation on a *-ring is analogous to complex conjugation on the complex numbers. The *-operation on a *-algebra is analogous to taking adjoints in complex matrix algebras.

=== Notation ===
The * involution is a unary operation written with a postfixed star glyph centered above or near the mean line:

x ↦ x*, or
x ↦ x^{∗} (TeX: x^*),

but not as "x∗"; see the asterisk article for details.

== Examples ==
- Any commutative ring becomes a *-ring with the trivial (identical) involution.
- The most familiar example of a *-ring and a *-algebra over reals is the field of complex numbers C where * is just complex conjugation.
- More generally, a field extension made by adjunction of a square root (such as the imaginary unit √−1) is a *-algebra over the original field, considered as a trivially-*-ring. The * flips the sign of that square root.
- A quadratic integer ring (for some D) is a commutative *-ring with the * defined in the similar way; quadratic fields are *-algebras over appropriate quadratic integer rings.
- Quaternions, split-complex numbers, dual numbers, and possibly other hypercomplex number systems form *-rings (with their built-in conjugation operation) and *-algebras over reals (where * is trivial). None of the three is a complex algebra.
- Hurwitz quaternions form a non-commutative *-ring with the quaternion conjugation.
- The matrix algebra of n × n matrices over R with * given by the transposition.
- The matrix algebra of n × n matrices over C with * given by the conjugate transpose.
- Its generalization, the Hermitian adjoint in the algebra of bounded linear operators on a Hilbert space also defines a *-algebra.
- The polynomial ring R[x] over a commutative trivially-*-ring R is a *-algebra over R with P *(x) = P (−x).
- If (A, +, ×, *) is simultaneously a *-ring, an algebra over a ring R (commutative), and (r x)* = r (x*) ∀r ∈ R, x ∈ A, then A is a *-algebra over R (where * is trivial).
  - As a partial case, any *-ring is a *-algebra over integers.
- Any commutative *-ring is a *-algebra over itself and, more generally, over any its *-subring.
- For a commutative *-ring R, its quotient by any its *-ideal is a *-algebra over R.
  - For example, any commutative trivially-*-ring is a *-algebra over its dual numbers ring, a *-ring with non-trivial *, because the quotient by ε = 0 makes the original ring.
  - The same about a commutative ring K and its polynomial ring K[x]: the quotient by x = 0 restores K.
- In Hecke algebra, an involution is important to the Kazhdan–Lusztig polynomial.
- The endomorphism ring of an elliptic curve becomes a *-algebra over the integers, where the involution is given by taking the dual isogeny. A similar construction works for abelian varieties with a polarization, in which case it is called the Rosati involution (see Milne's lecture notes on abelian varieties).

Involutive Hopf algebras are important examples of *-algebras (with the additional structure of a compatible comultiplication); the most familiar example being:

- The group Hopf algebra: a group ring, with involution given by g ↦ g^{−1}.

== Non-Example ==
Not every algebra admits an involution:

Regard the 2×2 matrices over the complex numbers. Consider the following subalgebra:
$$\mathcal{A} := \left\{\begin{pmatrix}a&b\\0&0\end{pmatrix} : a,b\in\Complex\right\}$$

Any nontrivial antiautomorphism necessarily has the form:
$$\varphi_z\left[\begin{pmatrix}1&0\\0&0\end{pmatrix}\right] = \begin{pmatrix}1&z\\0&0\end{pmatrix} \quad \varphi_z\left[\begin{pmatrix}0&1\\0&0\end{pmatrix}\right] = \begin{pmatrix}0&0\\0&0\end{pmatrix}$$
for any complex number $z\in\Complex$.

It follows that any nontrivial antiautomorphism fails to be involutive:
$$\varphi_z^2\left[\begin{pmatrix}0&1\\0&0\end{pmatrix}\right] = \begin{pmatrix}0&0\\0&0\end{pmatrix}\neq\begin{pmatrix}0&1\\0&0\end{pmatrix}$$

Concluding that the subalgebra admits no involution.

== Additional structures ==
Many properties of the transpose hold for general *-algebras:

- The Hermitian elements form a Jordan algebra;
- The skew Hermitian elements form a Lie algebra;
- If 2 is invertible in the *-ring, then the operators 1/2(1 + *) and 1/2(1 − *) are orthogonal idempotents, called symmetrizing and anti-symmetrizing, so the algebra decomposes as a direct sum of modules (vector spaces if the *-ring is a field) of symmetric and anti-symmetric (Hermitian and skew Hermitian) elements. These spaces do not, generally, form associative algebras, because the idempotents are operators, not elements of the algebra.

=== Skew structures ===
Given a *-ring, there is also the map −* : x ↦ −x*. It does not define a *-ring structure (unless the characteristic is 2, in which case −* is identical to the original *), as 1 ↦ −1, neither is it antimultiplicative, but it satisfies the other axioms (linear, involution) and hence is quite similar to *-algebra where x ↦ x*.

Elements fixed by this map (i.e., such that a = −a*) are called skew Hermitian.

For the complex numbers with complex conjugation, the real numbers are the Hermitian elements, and the imaginary numbers are the skew Hermitian.

== See also ==
- Semigroup with involution
- B*-algebra
- C*-algebra
- Dagger category
- von Neumann algebra
- Baer ring
- Operator algebra
- Conjugate (algebra)
- Cayley–Dickson construction
- Composition algebra
