= Graduate Texts in Mathematics =

Series of mathematics textbooks

Graduate Texts in Mathematics (GTM; ISSN 0072-5285) is a series of graduate-level textbooks in mathematics published by Springer-Verlag. The books in this series, like the other Springer-Verlag mathematics series, are yellow books of a standard size (with variable numbers of pages). The GTM series is easily identified by a white band at the top of the book.

The books in this series tend to be written at a more advanced level than the similar Undergraduate Texts in Mathematics series, although there is a fair amount of overlap between the two series in terms of material covered and difficulty level. Five of the volumes (122, 123, 129, 182, 206) are part of the subseries Readings in Mathematics.

The series was founded and edited by Paul Halmos, with the first volumes appearing in 1971. Halmos has said that it is the most successful series that he worked on. Early volumes in this series contained the following motivation for this book series

A student approaching mathematical research is often discouraged by the sheer volume of the literature and the long history of the subject, even when the actual problems are readily understandable. The new series, Graduate Texts in Mathematics, is intended to bridge the gap between passive study and creative understanding; it offers introductions on a suitably advanced level to areas of current research. These introductions are neither complete surveys nor brief accounts of the latest results only. They are textbooks carefully designed as teaching aids; the purpose of the authors is, in every case, to highlight the characteristic features of the theory. Graduate Texts in Mathematics can serve as the basis for advanced courses, they can be either the main or subsidiary sources for seminars, and they can be used for private study. Their guiding principle is to convince the student that mathematics is a living science.

== List of books ==
1. Introduction to Axiomatic Set Theory, Gaisi Takeuti, Wilson M. Zaring (1971 1st ed. ISBN 978-0-387-05302-8; 1982, 2nd ed., ISBN 978-1-4613-8170-9)
2. Measure and Category – A Survey of the Analogies between Topological and Measure Spaces, John C. Oxtoby ( 1971 1st ed., ISBN 978-0-387-90025-4; 1980, 2nd ed., ISBN 978-0-387-90508-2)
3. Topological Vector Spaces, H. H. Schaefer, M. P. Wolff (1971 1st ed. ISBN 978-0-387-05380-6; 1999, 2nd ed., ISBN 978-0-387-98726-2)
4. A Course in Homological Algebra, Peter Hilton, Urs Stammbach ( 1971 1st ed. ISBN 978-0-387-90033-9; 1997, 2nd ed., ISBN 978-0-387-94823-2)
5. Categories for the Working Mathematician, Saunders Mac Lane (1971 1st ed. ISBN 978-0-387-90036-0; 1998, 2nd ed., ISBN 978-0-387-98403-2)
6. Projective Planes, Daniel R. Hughes, Fred C. Piper, (1973 ISBN 978-0-387-90044-5)
7. A Course in Arithmetic, Jean-Pierre Serre (1973 ISBN 978-0-387-90041-4)
8. Axiomatic Set Theory, Gaisi Takeuti, Wilson M. Zaring, (1973, ISBN 978-0-387-90050-6)
9. Introduction to Lie Algebras and Representation Theory, James E. Humphreys (1972 ISBN 978-0-387-90052-0)
10. A Course in Simple-Homotopy Theory, Marshall. M. Cohen, (1973, ISBN 0-387-90056-X)
11. Functions of One Complex Variable I, John B. Conway (1973 1st ed., ISBN 978-0-387-90062-9; 1978, 2nd ed., ISBN 978-0-387-90328-6)
12. Advanced Mathematical Analysis, Richard Beals (1973, ISBN 978-0-387-90065-0)
13. Rings and Categories of Modules, Frank W. Anderson, Kent R. Fuller (1974 1st ed, ISBN 978-0-387-90069-8; 1992, 2nd ed., ISBN 978-0-387-97845-1)
14. Stable Mappings and Their Singularities, Martin Golubitsky, Victor Guillemin, (1974, ISBN 978-0-387-90072-8)
15. Lectures in Functional Analysis and Operator Theory, Sterling K. Berberian, (1974, ISBN 978-0-387-90080-3)
16. The Structure of Fields, David J. Winter, (1974, ISBN 978-3-540-90074-0)
17. Random Processes, Murray Rosenblatt, (1974, ISBN 978-0-387-90085-8)
18. Measure Theory, Paul R. Halmos (1974, ISBN 978-0-387-90088-9)
19. A Hilbert Space Problem Book, Paul R. Halmos (1974, 1st ed., ISBN 978-0-387-90090-2; 1982, 2nd ed., ISBN 978-0-387-90685-0)
20. Fibre Bundles, Dale Husemoller (1975, 2nd ed., ISBN 978-0-387-90103-9; 1994, 3rd ed., ISBN 978-0-387-94087-8)
21. Linear Algebraic Groups, James E. Humphreys (1975, ISBN 978-0-387-90108-4)
22. An Algebraic Introduction to Mathematical Logic, Donald W. Barnes, John M. Mack (1975, ISBN 978-0-387-90109-1)
23. Linear Algebra, Werner H. Greub (1975, 4th ed., ISBN 978-0-387-90110-7)
24. Geometric Functional Analysis and Its Applications, Richard B. Holmes, (1975, ISBN 978-0-387-90136-7)
25. Real and Abstract Analysis, Edwin Hewitt, Karl Stromberg (1975, ISBN 978-0-387-90138-1)
26. Algebraic Theories, Ernest G. Manes, (1976, ISBN 978-3-540-90140-2)
27. General Topology, John L. Kelley (1975, ISBN 978-0-387-90125-1)
28. Commutative Algebra I, Oscar Zariski, Pierre Samuel (1975, ISBN 978-0-387-90089-6)
29. Commutative Algebra II, Oscar Zariski, Pierre Samuel (1975, ISBN 978-0-387-90171-8)
30. Lectures in Abstract Algebra I: Basic Concepts, Nathan Jacobson (1976, ISBN 978-0-387-90181-7)
31. Lectures in Abstract Algebra II: Linear Algebra, Nathan Jacobson (1984, ISBN 978-0-387-90123-7)
32. Lectures in Abstract Algebra III: Theory of Fields and Galois Theory, Nathan Jacobson (1976, ISBN 978-0-387-90168-8)
33. Differential Topology, Morris W. Hirsch (1976, ISBN 978-0-387-90148-0)
34. Principles of Random Walk, Frank Spitzer (1976, 2nd ed., ISBN 978-0-387-90150-3)
35. Several Complex Variables and Banach Algebras, Herbert Alexander, John Wermer (1976 1st edition ISBN 0-387-90160-4; 1998, 3rd ed., ISBN 978-0-387-98253-3)
36. Linear Topological Spaces, John L. Kelley, Isaac Namioka (1982, ISBN 978-0-387-90169-5)
37. Mathematical Logic, J. Donald Monk (1976, ISBN 978-0-387-90170-1)
38. Several Complex Variables, H. Grauert, K. Fritzsche (1976, ISBN 978-0-387-90172-5)
39. An Invitation to $C^*$-Algebras, William Arveson (1976, ISBN 978-0-387-90176-3)
40. Denumerable Markov Chains, John G. Kemeny, J. Laurie Snell, Anthony W. Knapp, D.S. Griffeath (1976, 2nd ed., ISBN 978-0-387-90177-0)
41. Modular Functions and Dirichlet Series in Number Theory, Tom M. Apostol (1989, 2nd ed., ISBN 978-0-387-97127-8)
42. Linear Representations of Finite Groups, Jean-Pierre Serre, Leonhard L. Scott (1977, ISBN 978-0-387-90190-9)
43. Rings of Continuous Functions, Leonard Gillman, Meyer Jerison (1976, ISBN 978-0-387-90198-5)
44. Elementary Algebraic Geometry, Keith Kendig (1977, ISBN 978-0-387-90199-2)
45. Probability Theory I, M. Loève (1977, 4th ed., ISBN 978-0-387-90210-4)
46. Probability Theory II, M. Loève (1978, 4th ed., ISBN 978-0-387-90262-3)
47. Geometric Topology in Dimensions 2 and 3, Edwin E. Moise (1977, ISBN 978-0-387-90220-3)
48. General Relativity for Mathematicians, R. K. Sachs, H. Wu (1983, ISBN 978-0-387-90218-0)
49. Linear Geometry, K. W. Gruenberg, A. J. Weir (1977, 2nd ed., ISBN 978-0-387-90227-2)
50. Fermat's Last Theorem: A Genetic Introduction to Algebraic Number Theory, Harold M. Edwards (2000, ISBN 978-0-387-90230-2)
51. A Course in Differential Geometry, William Klingenberg, D. Hoffman (1983, ISBN 978-0-387-90255-5)
52. Algebraic Geometry, Robin Hartshorne (2010, ISBN 978-1-4419-2807-8)
53. A Course in Mathematical Logic for Mathematicians, Yu. I. Manin, Boris Zilber (2009, 2nd ed., ISBN 978-1-4419-0614-4)
54. Combinatorics with Emphasis on the Theory of Graphs, Mark E. Watkins, Jack E. Graver (1977, ISBN 978-0-387-90245-6)
55. Introduction to Operator Theory I: Elements of Functional Analysis, Arlen Brown, Carl Pearcy (1977, ISBN 978-0-387-90257-9)
56. Algebraic Topology: An Introduction, William S. Massey (1977, ISBN 978-0-387-90271-5)
57. Introduction to Knot Theory, Richard H. Crowell, Ralph H. Fox (1977, ISBN 978-0-387-90272-2)
58. p-adic Numbers, p-adic Analysis, and Zeta-Functions, Neal Koblitz (1984, 2nd ed., ISBN 978-0-387-96017-3)
59. Cyclotomic Fields, Serge Lang (1978, ISBN 978-0-387-90307-1)
60. Mathematical Methods of Classical Mechanics, V. I. Arnold,(1989, 2nd ed., ISBN 978-0-387-96890-2)
61. Elements of Homotopy Theory, George W. Whitehead (1978, ISBN 978-0-387-90336-1)
62. Fundamentals of the Theory of Groups, M. I. Kargapolov, J. I. Merzljakov (1979, ISBN 978-1-4612-9966-0)
63. Graph Theory – An Introductory Course, Béla Bollobás (1979, ISBN 978-1-4612-9969-1)
64. Fourier Series – A Modern Introduction Volume 1, R. E. Edwards (1979, 2nd ed., ISBN 978-1-4612-6210-7)
65. Differential Analysis on Complex Manifolds, Raymond O. Wells, Jr. (2008, 3rd ed., ISBN 978-0-387-73891-8)
66. Introduction to Affine Group Schemes, W. C. Waterhouse (1979, ISBN 978-1-4612-6219-0)
67. Local Fields, Jean-Pierre Serre (1979, ISBN 978-0-387-90424-5)
68. Linear Operators in Hilbert Spaces, Joachim Weidmann (1980, ISBN 978-1-4612-6029-5)
69. Cyclotomic Fields II, Serge Lang (1980, ISBN 978-1-4684-0088-5)
70. Singular Homology Theory, William S. Massey (1980, ISBN 978-1-4684-9233-0)
71. Riemann Surfaces, Herschel Farkas, Irwin Kra (1992, 2nd ed., ISBN 978-0-387-97703-4)
72. Classical Topology and Combinatorial Group Theory, John Stillwell (1980, 2nd ed., 1993, ISBN 978-0-3879-7970-0)
73. Algebra, Thomas W. Hungerford (1974, ISBN 978-0-387-90518-1)
74. Multiplicative Number Theory, Harold Davenport, Hugh Montgomery (2000, 3rd ed., ISBN 978-0-387-95097-6)
75. Basic Theory of Algebraic Groups and Lie Algebras, G. P. Hochschild (1981, ISBN 978-1-4613-8116-7)
76. Algebraic Geometry – An Introduction to Birational Geometry of Algebraic Varieties, Shigeru Iitaka (1982, ISBN 978-1-4613-8121-1)
77. Lectures on the Theory of Algebraic Numbers, E. T. Hecke (1981, ISBN 978-0-387-90595-2)
78. A Course in Universal Algebra, Burris, Stanley and Sankappanavar, H. P. (Online) (1981 ISBN 978-0-3879-0578-5)
79. An Introduction to Ergodic Theory, Peter Walters (1982, ISBN 978-0-387-95152-2)
80. A Course in the Theory of Groups, Derek J.S. Robinson (1996, 2nd ed., ISBN 978-0-387-94461-6)
81. Lectures on Riemann Surfaces, Otto Forster (1981, ISBN 978-0-387-90617-1)
82. Differential Forms in Algebraic Topology, Raoul Bott, Loring W. Tu (1982, ISBN 978-0-387-90613-3)
83. Introduction to Cyclotomic Fields, Lawrence C. Washington (1997, 2nd ed., ISBN 978-0-387-94762-4)
84. A Classical Introduction to Modern Number Theory, Kenneth Ireland, Michael Rosen (1990, 2nd ed., ISBN 978-0-387-97329-6)
85. Fourier Series – A Modern Introduction Volume 2, R. E. Edwards (1982, 2nd ed., ISBN 978-1-4613-8158-7)
86. Introduction to Coding Theory, J. H. van Lint (3rd ed 1998, ISBN 3-540-64133-5)
87. Cohomology of Groups, Kenneth S. Brown (1982, ISBN 978-1-4684-9329-0)
88. Associative Algebras, Richard S. Pierce (1982, ISBN 978-1-4757-0165-4)
89. Introduction to Algebraic and Abelian Functions, Serge Lang (1982, 2nd ed., ISBN 978-0-387-90710-9)
90. An Introduction to Convex Polytopes, Arne Brondsted (1983, ISBN 978-1-4612-1148-8)
91. The Geometry of Discrete Groups, Alan F. Beardon (1983, 2nd print 1995, ISBN 978-1-4612-7022-5)
92. Sequences and Series in Banach Spaces, J. Diestel (1984, ISBN 978-1-4612-9734-5)
93. Modern Geometry — Methods and Applications Part I: The Geometry of Surfaces, Transformation Groups, and Fields, B. A. Dubrovin, Anatoly Timofeevich Fomenko, Sergei Novikov (1992, 2nd ed., ISBN 978-0-387-97663-1)
94. Foundations of Differentiable Manifolds and Lie Groups, Frank W. Warner (1983, ISBN 978-0-387-90894-6)
95. Probability-1, Probability-2, Albert N. Shiryaev (2016, 2019, 3rd ed., ISBN 978-0-387-72205-4, ISBN 978-0-387-72207-8)
96. A Course in Functional Analysis, John B. Conway (2007, 2nd ed., ISBN 978-0-387-97245-9)
97. Introduction to Elliptic Curves and Modular Forms, Neal I. Koblitz (1993, 2nd ed., ISBN 978-0-387-97966-3)
98. Representations of Compact Lie Groups, Theodor Bröcker, Tammo tom Dieck (1985, ISBN 978-3-540-13678-1)
99. Finite Reflection Groups, L.C. Grove, C.T. Benson (1985, 2nd ed., ISBN 978-0-387-96082-1)
100. Harmonic Analysis on Semigroups – Theory of Positive Definite and Related Functions, Christian Berg, Jens Peter Reus Christensen, Paul Ressel (1984, ISBN 978-0-387-90925-7)
101. Galois Theory, Harold M. Edwards (1984, ISBN 978-0-387-90980-6)
102. Lie Groups, Lie Algebras, and Their Representations, V. S. Varadarajan (1984, ISBN 978-0-387-90969-1)
103. Complex Analysis, Serge Lang (1999, 4th ed., ISBN 978-0-387-98592-3)
104. Modern Geometry — Methods and Applications Part II: The Geometry and Topology of Manifolds, B. A. Dubrovin, Anatoly Timofeevich Fomenko, Sergei Novikov (1985, ISBN 978-0-387-96162-0)
105. SL_{2}(R), Serge Lang (1985, ISBN 978-0-387-96198-9)
106. The Arithmetic of Elliptic Curves, Joseph H. Silverman (2009, 2nd ed., ISBN 978-0-387-09493-9)
107. Applications of Lie Groups to Differential Equations, Peter J. Olver (2nd ed., 1993, ISBN 978-1-4684-0276-6)
108. Holomorphic Functions and Integral Representations in Several Complex Variables, R. Michael Range (1986, ISBN 978-0-387-96259-7)
109. Univalent Functions and Teichmüller Spaces, O. Lehto (1987, ISBN 978-1-4613-8654-4)
110. Algebraic Number Theory, Serge Lang (1994, 2nd ed., ISBN 978-0-387-94225-4)
111. Elliptic Curves, Dale Husemöller (2004, 2nd ed., ISBN 978-0-387-95490-5)
112. Elliptic Functions, Serge Lang (1987, 2nd ed., ISBN 978-0-387-96508-6)
113. Brownian Motion and Stochastic Calculus, Ioannis Karatzas, Steven Shreve (2nd ed., 2000, ISBN 978-0-387-97655-6)
114. A Course in Number Theory and Cryptography, Neal Koblitz (2nd ed., 1994, ISBN 978-1-4684-0312-1)
115. Differential Geometry: Manifolds, Curves and Surfaces, Marcel Berger, Bernard Gostiaux (1988, ISBN 978-0-387-96626-7)
116. Measure and Integral — Volume 1, John L. Kelley, T.P. Srinivasan (1988, ISBN 978-0-387-96633-5)
117. Algebraic Groups and Class Fields, Jean-Pierre Serre (1988, ISBN 978-1-4612-6993-9)
118. Analysis Now, Gert K. Pedersen (1989, ISBN 978-0-387-96788-2)
119. An Introduction to Algebraic Topology, Joseph J. Rotman, (1988, ISBN 978-0-3879-6678-6)
120. Weakly Differentiable Functions — Sobolev Spaces and Functions of Bounded Variation, William P. Ziemer (1989, ISBN 978-0-387-97017-2)
121. Cyclotomic Fields I and II, Serge Lang (1990, Combined 2nd ed. ISBN 978-1-4612-6972-4)
122. Theory of Complex Functions, Reinhold Remmert (1991, ISBN 978-0-387-97195-7)
123. Numbers, Heinz-Dieter Ebbinghaus et al. (1990, ISBN 978-0-387-97497-2)
124. Modern Geometry — Methods and Applications Part III: Introduction to Homology Theory, B. A. Dubrovin, Anatoly Timofeevich Fomenko, Sergei Novikov (1990, ISBN 978-0-387-97271-8)
125. Complex Variables — An Introduction, Carlos A. Berenstein, Roger Gay (1991, ISBN 978-0-387-97349-4)
126. Linear Algebraic Groups, Armand Borel (1991, Second enlarged edition, ISBN 978-0-387-97370-8)
127. A Basic Course in Algebraic Topology, William S. Massey (1991, ISBN 978-0-3879-7430-9)
128. Partial Differential Equations, Jeffrey Rauch (1991, ISBN 978-1-4612-6959-5)
129. Representation Theory, William Fulton, Joe Harris (1991, ISBN 978-3-5400-0539-1)
130. Tensor Geometry — The Geometric Viewpoint and its Uses, Christopher T. J. Dodson, Timothy Poston (1991, 2nd ed., ISBN 978-3-540-52018-4)
131. A First Course in Noncommutative Rings, T. Y. Lam (2001, 2nd ed., ISBN 978-0-387-95183-6)
132. Iteration of Rational Functions — Complex Analytic Dynamical Systems, Alan F. Beardon (1991, ISBN 978-0-387-95151-5)
133. Algebraic Geometry, Joe Harris (1992, ISBN 978-0-387-97716-4)
134. Coding and Information Theory, Steven Roman (1992, ISBN 978-0-387-97812-3)
135. Advanced Linear Algebra, Steven Roman (2008, 3rd ed., ISBN 978-0-387-72828-5)
136. Algebra — An Approach via Module Theory, William Adkins, Steven Weintraub (1992, ISBN 978-0-387-97839-0)
137. Harmonic Function Theory, Sheldon Axler, Paul Bourdon, Wade Ramey (2001, 2nd ed., ISBN 978-0-387-95218-5)
138. A Course in Computational Algebraic Number Theory, Henri Cohen (1996, ISBN 0-387-55640-0)
139. Topology and Geometry, Glen E. Bredon (1993, ISBN 978-0-387-97926-7)
140. Optima and Equilibria, Jean-Pierre Aubin (1998, 2nd ed., ISBN 978-3-642-08446-1)
141. Gröbner Bases — A Computational Approach to Commutative Algebra, Thomas Becker, Volker Weispfenning (1993, ISBN 978-0-387-97971-7)
142. Real and Functional Analysis, Serge Lang (1993, 3rd ed., ISBN 978-0-387-94001-4)
143. Measure Theory, J. L. Doob (1994, ISBN 978-0-387-94055-7)
144. Noncommutative Algebra, Benson Farb, R. Keith Dennis (1993, ISBN 978-0-387-94057-1)
145. Homology Theory — An Introduction to Algebraic Topology, James W. Vick (1994, 2nd ed., ISBN 978-0-387-94126-4)
146. Computability — A Mathematical Sketchbook, Douglas S. Bridges (1994, ISBN 978-0-387-94174-5)
147. Algebraic K-Theory and Its Applications, Jonathan Rosenberg (1994, ISBN 978-0-387-94248-3)
148. An Introduction to the Theory of Groups, Joseph J. Rotman (1995, 4th ed., ISBN 978-0-387-94285-8)
149. Foundations of Hyperbolic Manifolds, John G. Ratcliffe (2019, 3rd ed., ISBN 978-3-030-31597-9)
150. Commutative Algebra — with a View Toward Algebraic Geometry, David Eisenbud (1995, ISBN 978-0-387-94269-8)
151. Advanced Topics in the Arithmetic of Elliptic Curves, Joseph H. Silverman (1994, ISBN 978-0-387-94328-2)
152. Lectures on Polytopes, Günter M. Ziegler (1995, ISBN 978-0-387-94365-7)
153. Algebraic Topology — A First Course, William Fulton (1995, ISBN 978-0-387-94327-5)
154. An Introduction to Analysis, Arlen Brown, Carl Pearcy (1995, ISBN 978-0-387-94369-5)
155. Quantum Groups, Christian Kassel (1995, ISBN 978-0-387-94370-1)
156. Classical Descriptive Set Theory, Alexander S. Kechris (1995, ISBN 978-0-387-94374-9)
157. Integration and Probability, Paul Malliavin (1995, ISBN 978-0-387-94409-8)
158. Field Theory, Steven Roman (2006, 2nd ed., ISBN 978-0-387-27677-9)
159. Functions of One Complex Variable II, John B. Conway (1995, ISBN 978-0-387-94460-9)
160. Differential and Riemannian Manifolds, Serge Lang (1995, ISBN 978-0-387-94338-1)
161. Polynomials and Polynomial Inequalities, Peter Borwein, Tamas Erdelyi (1995, ISBN 978-0-387-94509-5)
162. Groups and Representations, J. L. Alperin, Rowen B. Bell (1995, ISBN 978-0-387-94526-2)
163. Permutation Groups, John D. Dixon, Brian Mortimer (1996, ISBN 978-0-387-94599-6)
164. Additive Number Theory The Classical Bases, Melvyn B. Nathanson (1996, ISBN 978-0-387-94656-6)
165. Additive Number Theory: Inverse Problems and the Geometry of Sumsets, Melvyn B. Nathanson (1996, ISBN 978-0-387-94655-9)
166. Differential Geometry — Cartan's Generalization of Klein's Erlangen Program, R. W. Sharpe (1997, ISBN 978-0-387-94732-7)
167. Field and Galois Theory, Patrick Morandi (1996, ISBN 978-0-387-94753-2)
168. Combinatorial Convexity and Algebraic Geometry, Guenter Ewald (1996, ISBN 978-1-4612-8476-5)
169. Matrix Analysis, Rajendra Bhatia (1997, ISBN 978-0-387-94846-1)
170. Sheaf Theory, Glen E. Bredon (1997, 2nd ed., ISBN 978-0-387-94905-5)
171. Riemannian Geometry, Peter Petersen (2016, 3rd ed., ISBN 978-3-319-26652-7)
172. Classical Topics in Complex Function Theory, Reinhold Remmert (1998, ISBN 978-0-387-98221-2)
173. Graph Theory, Reinhard Diestel (2025, 6th ed., ISBN 978-3-662-70107-2)
174. Foundations of Real and Abstract Analysis, Douglas S. Bridges (1998, ISBN 978-0-387-98239-7)
175. An Introduction to Knot Theory, W. B. Raymond Lickorish (1997, ISBN 978-1-4612-6869-7)
176. Introduction to Riemannian Manifolds, John M. Lee (2018, 2nd ed., ISBN 978-3-319-91754-2)
177. Analytic Number Theory , Donald J. Newman (1998, ISBN 978-0-387-98308-0)
178. Nonsmooth Analysis and Control Theory, Francis H. Clarke, Yuri S. Ledyaev, Ronald J. Stern, Peter R. Wolenski (1998, ISBN 978-0-387-98336-3)
179. Banach Algebra Techniques in Operator Theory, Ronald G. Douglas (1998, 2nd ed., ISBN 978-0-387-98377-6)
180. A Course on Borel Sets, S. M. Srivastava (1998, ISBN 978-0-387-98412-4)
181. Numerical Analysis, Rainer Kress (1998, ISBN 978-0-387-98408-7)
182. Ordinary Differential Equations, Wolfgang Walter (1998, ISBN 978-0-387-98459-9)
183. An Introduction to Banach Space Theory, Robert E. Megginson (1998, ISBN 978-0-387-98431-5)
184. Modern Graph Theory, Béla Bollobás (1998, ISBN 978-0-387-98488-9)
185. Using Algebraic Geometry, David A. Cox, John Little, Donal O'Shea (2005, 2nd ed., ISBN 978-0-387-20706-3)
186. Fourier Analysis on Number Fields, Dinakar Ramakrishnan, Robert J. Valenza (1999, ISBN 978-0-387-98436-0)
187. Moduli of Curves, Joe Harris, Ian Morrison (1998, ISBN 978-0-387-98438-4)
188. Lectures on the Hyperreals – An Introduction to Nonstandard Analysis, Robert Goldblatt (1998, ISBN 978-0-387-98464-3)
189. Lectures on Modules and Rings, Tsit-Yuen Lam (1999, ISBN 978-0-387-98428-5)
190. Problems in Algebraic Number Theory, M. Ram Murty, Jody Indigo Esmonde (2005, 2nd ed., ISBN 978-0-387-22182-3)
191. Fundamentals of Differential Geometry, Serge Lang (1999, ISBN 978-0-387-98593-0)
192. Elements of Functional Analysis, Francis Hirsch, Gilles Lacombe (1999, ISBN 978-0-387-98524-4)
193. Advanced Topics in Computational Number Theory, Henri Cohen (2000, ISBN 0-387-98727-4)
194. One-Parameter Semigroups for Linear Evolution Equations, Klaus-Jochen Engel, Rainer Nagel (2000, ISBN 978-0-387-98463-6)
195. Elementary Methods in Number Theory, Melvyn B. Nathanson (2000, ISBN 978-0-387-98912-9)
196. Basic Homological Algebra, M. Scott Osborne (2000, ISBN 978-0-387-98934-1)
197. The Geometry of Schemes, Eisenbud, Joe Harris (2000, ISBN 978-0-387-98638-8)
198. A Course in p-adic Analysis, Alain M. Robert (2000, ISBN 978-0-387-98669-2)
199. Theory of Bergman Spaces, Hakan Hedenmalm, Boris Korenblum, Kehe Zhu (2000, ISBN 978-0-387-98791-0)
200. An Introduction to Riemann–Finsler Geometry, David Bao, Shiing-Shen Chern, Zhongmin Shen (2000, ISBN 978-1-4612-7070-6)
201. Diophantine Geometry, Marc Hindry, Joseph H. Silverman (2000, ISBN 978-0-387-98975-4)
202. Introduction to Topological Manifolds, John M. Lee (2011, 2nd ed., ISBN 978-1-4419-7939-1)
203. The Symmetric Group — Representations, Combinatorial Algorithms, and Symmetric Functions, Bruce E. Sagan (2001, 2nd ed., ISBN 978-0-387-95067-9)
204. Galois Theory, Jean-Pierre Escofier (2001, ISBN 978-0-387-98765-1)
205. Rational Homotopy Theory, Yves Félix, Stephen Halperin, Jean-Claude Thomas (2000, ISBN 978-0-387-95068-6)
206. Problems in Analytic Number Theory, M. Ram Murty (2007, 2nd ed., ISBN 978-0-387-95143-0)
207. Algebraic Graph Theory, Chris Godsil, Gordon Royle (2001, ISBN 978-0-387-95241-3)
208. Analysis for Applied Mathematics, Ward Cheney (2001, ISBN 978-0-387-95279-6)
209. A Short Course on Spectral Theory, William Arveson (2002, ISBN 978-0-387-95300-7)
210. Number Theory in Function Fields, Michael Rosen (2002, ISBN 978-0-387-95335-9)
211. Algebra, Serge Lang (2002, Revised 3rd ed., ISBN 978-0-387-95385-4)
212. Lectures on Discrete Geometry, Jiří Matoušek (2002, ISBN 978-0-387-95374-8)
213. From Holomorphic Functions to Complex Manifolds, Klaus Fritzsche, Hans Grauert (2002, ISBN 978-0-387-95395-3)
214. Partial Differential Equations, Jürgen Jost, (2013, 3rd ed., ISBN 978-1-4614-4808-2)
215. Algebraic Functions and Projective Curves, David M. Goldschmidt, (2003, ISBN 978-0-387-95432-5)
216. Matrices — Theory and Applications, Denis Serre, (2010, 2nd ed., ISBN 978-1-4419-7682-6)
217. Model Theory: An Introduction, David Marker, (2002, ISBN 978-0-387-98760-6)
218. Introduction to Smooth Manifolds, John M. Lee (2012, 2nd ed., ISBN 978-1-4419-9981-8)
219. The Arithmetic of Hyperbolic 3-Manifolds, Colin Maclachlan, Alan W. Reid, (2003, ISBN 978-0-387-98386-8)
220. Smooth Manifolds and Observables, Jet Nestruev, (2020, 2nd ed., ISBN 978-0-387-95543-8 )
221. Convex Polytopes, Branko Grünbaum (2003, 2nd ed., ISBN 978-0-387-40409-7)
222. Lie Groups, Lie Algebras, and Representations – An Elementary Introduction, Brian C. Hall, (2015, 2nd ed., ISBN 978-3-319-13466-6)
223. Fourier Analysis and its Applications, Anders Vretblad, (2003, ISBN 978-0-387-00836-3)
224. Metric Structures in Differential Geometry, Walschap, G., (2004, ISBN 978-0-387-20430-7)
225. Lie Groups, Daniel Bump, (2013, 2nd ed., ISBN 978-1-4614-8023-5)
226. Spaces of Holomorphic Functions in the Unit Ball, Kehe Zhu, (2005, ISBN 978-0-387-22036-9)
227. Combinatorial Commutative Algebra, Ezra Miller, Bernd Sturmfels, (2005, ISBN 978-0-387-22356-8)
228. A First Course in Modular Forms, Fred Diamond, J. Shurman, (2006, ISBN 978-0-387-23229-4)
229. The Geometry of Syzygies – A Second Course in Algebraic Geometry and Commutative Algebra, David Eisenbud (2005, ISBN 978-0-387-22215-8)
230. An Introduction to Markov Processes, Daniel W. Stroock, (2014, 2nd ed., ISBN 978-3-540-23499-9)
231. Combinatorics of Coxeter Groups, Anders Björner, Francisco Brenti, (2005, ISBN 978-3-540-44238-7)
232. An Introduction to Number Theory, Graham Everest, Thomas Ward., (2005, ISBN 978-1-85233-917-3)
233. Topics in Banach Space Theory, Albiac, F., Kalton, N. J., (2016, 2nd ed., ISBN 978-3-319-31555-3)
234. Analysis and Probability — Wavelets, Signals, Fractals, Jorgensen, P. E. T., (2006, ISBN 978-0-387-29519-0)
235. Compact Lie Groups, M. R. Sepanski, (2007, ISBN 978-0-387-30263-8)
236. Bounded Analytic Functions, Garnett, J., (2007, ISBN 978-0-387-33621-3)
237. An Introduction to Operators on the Hardy–Hilbert Space, Ruben A. Martinez-Avendano, Peter Rosenthal, (2007, ISBN 978-0-387-35418-7)
238. A Course in Enumeration, Martin Aigner, (2007, ISBN 978-3-540-39032-9)
239. Number Theory — Volume I: Tools and Diophantine Equations, Henri Cohen, (2007, ISBN 978-0-387-49922-2)
240. Number Theory — Volume II: Analytic and Modern Tools, Henri Cohen, (2007, ISBN 978-0-387-49893-5)
241. The Arithmetic of Dynamical Systems, Joseph H. Silverman, (2007, ISBN 978-0-387-69903-5)
242. Abstract Algebra, Grillet, Pierre Antoine, (2007, ISBN 978-0-387-71567-4)
243. Topological Methods in Group Theory, Geoghegan, Ross, (2007, ISBN 978-0-387-74611-1)
244. Graph Theory, Adrian Bondy, U.S.R. Murty, (2008, ISBN 978-1-84628-969-9)
245. Complex Analysis – In the Spirit of Lipman Bers, Rubí E. Rodríguez, Irwin Kra, Jane P. Gilman (2013, 2nd ed., ISBN 978-1-4899-9908-5)
246. A Course in Commutative Banach Algebras, Kaniuth, Eberhard, (2008, ISBN 978-0-387-72475-1)
247. Braid Groups, Kassel, Christian, Turaev, Vladimir, (2008, ISBN 978-0-387-33841-5)
248. Buildings Theory and Applications, Abramenko, Peter, Brown, Ken (2008, ISBN 978-0-387-78834-0)
249. Classical Fourier Analysis, Loukas Grafakos (2014, 3rd ed., ISBN 978-1-4939-1193-6)
250. Modern Fourier Analysis, Loukas Grafakos (2014, 3rd ed., ISBN 978-1-4939-1229-2)
251. The Finite Simple Groups, Robert A. Wilson (2009, ISBN 978-1-84800-987-5)
252. Distributions and Operators, Gerd Grubb, (2009, ISBN 978-0-387-84894-5)
253. Elementary Functional Analysis, MacCluer, Barbara D., (2009, ISBN 978-0-387-85528-8)
254. Algebraic Function Fields and Codes, Henning Stichtenoth, (2009, 2nd ed., ISBN 978-3-540-76877-7)
255. Symmetry, Representations, and Invariants, Goodman, Roe, Wallach, Nolan R., (2009, ISBN 978-0-387-79851-6)
256. A Course in Commutative Algebra, Kemper, Gregor, (2010, ISBN 978-3-642-03544-9)
257. Deformation Theory, Robin Hartshorne, (2010, ISBN 978-1-4419-1595-5)
258. Foundations of Optimization in Finite Dimensions, Osman Guler, (2010, ISBN 978-0-387-34431-7)
259. Ergodic Theory – with a view towards Number Theory, Manfred Einsiedler, Thomas Ward, (2011, ISBN 978-0-85729-020-5)
260. Monomial Ideals, Jürgen Herzog, Hibi Takayuki(2010, ISBN 978-0-85729-105-9)
261. Probability and Stochastics, Erhan Cinlar, (2011, ISBN 978-0-387-87858-4)
262. Essentials of Integration Theory for Analysis, Daniel W. Stroock, (2012, ISBN 978-1-4614-1134-5)
263. Analysis on Fock Spaces, Kehe Zhu, (2012, ISBN 978-1-4419-8800-3)
264. Functional Analysis, Calculus of Variations and Optimal Control, Francis H. Clarke, (2013, ISBN 978-1-4471-4819-7)
265. Unbounded Self-adjoint Operators on Hilbert Space, Konrad Schmüdgen, (2012, ISBN 978-94-007-4752-4)
266. Calculus Without Derivatives, Jean-Paul Penot, (2012, ISBN 978-1-4614-4537-1)
267. Quantum Theory for Mathematicians, Brian C. Hall, (2013, ISBN 978-1-4614-7115-8)
268. Geometric Analysis of the Bergman Kernel and Metric, Krantz, Steven G., (2013, ISBN 978-1-4614-7923-9)
269. Locally Convex Spaces, M Scott Osborne, (2014, ISBN 978-3-319-02044-0)
270. Fundamentals of Algebraic Topology, Steven Weintraub, (2014, ISBN 978-1-4939-1843-0)
271. Integer Programming, Michelangelo Conforti, Gérard P. Cornuéjols, Giacomo Zambelli, (2014, ISBN 978-3-319-11007-3)
272. Operator Theoretic Aspects of Ergodic Theory, Tanja Eisner, Bálint Farkas, Markus Haase, Rainer Nagel, (2015, ISBN 978-3-319-16897-5)
273. Homotopical Topology, Anatoly Fomenko, Dmitry Fuchs, (2016, 2nd ed., ISBN 978-3-319-23487-8)
274. Brownian Motion, Martingales, and Stochastic Calculus, Jean-François Le Gall, (2016, ISBN 978-3-319-31088-6)
275. Differential Geometry – Connections, Curvature, and Characteristic Classes, Loring W. Tu (2017, ISBN 978-3-319-55082-4)
276. Functional Analysis, Spectral Theory, and Applications, Manfred Einsiedler, Thomas Ward (2017, ISBN 978-3-319-58539-0)
277. The Moment Problem, Konrad Schmüdgen (2017, ISBN 978-3-319-64545-2)
278. Modern Real Analysis, William P. Ziemer (2017, 2nd ed., ISBN 978-3-319-64628-2)
279. Binomial Ideals, Jürgen Herzog, Takayuki Hibi, Hidefumi Ohsugi (2018, ISBN 978-3-319-95347-2)
280. Introduction to Real Analysis, Christopher Heil (2019, ISBN 978-3-030-26901-2)
281. Intersection Homology & Perverse Sheaves with Applications to Singularities, Laurenţiu G. Maxim (2019, ISBN 978-3-030-27644-7)
282. Measure, Integration & Real Analysis, Sheldon Axler (2020, ISBN 978-3-030-33143-6)
283. Basic Representation Theory of Algebras, Ibrahim Assem, Flávio U Coelho (2020, ISBN 978-3-030-35117-5)
284. Spectral Theory – Basic Concepts and Applications, David Borthwick (2020, ISBN 978-3-030-38001-4)
285. An Invitation to Unbounded Representations of ∗-Algebras on Hilbert Space, Konrad Schmüdgen (2020, ISBN 978-3-030-46365-6)
286. Lectures on Convex Geometry, Daniel Hug, Wolfgang Weil (2020, ISBN 978-3-030-50179-2)
287. Explorations in Complex Functions, Richard Beals, Roderick S. C. Wong (2020, ISBN 978-3-030-54532-1)
288. Quaternion Algebras, John Voight (2020, ISBN 978-3-030-56692-0)
289. Ergodic Dynamics – From Basic Theory to Applications, Jane M. Hawkins (2020, ISBN 978-3-030-59242-4)
290. Lessons in Enumerative Combinatorics, Omer Egecioglu, Adriano Garsia (2021, ISBN 978-3-030-71249-5)
291. Mathematical Logic, Heinz-Dieter Ebbinghaus, Jörg Flum, Wolfgang Thomas (2021, 3rd ed. ISBN 978-3-030-73839-6)
292. Random Walk, Brownian Motion and Martingales, Rabi Bhattacharya, Edward C. Waymire (2021, ISBN 978-3-030-78939-8)
293. Stationary Processes and Discrete Parameter Markov Processes, Rabi Bhattacharya, Edward C. Waymire (2022, ISBN 978-3-031-00941-9)
294. Partial Differential Equations, Wolfgang Arendt, Karsten Urban (2023, ISBN 978-3-031-13378-7)
295. Measure Theory, Probability, and Stochastic Processes, Jean-François Le Gall (2022, ISBN 978-3-031-14205-5)
296. Drinfeld Modules, Mihran Papikian (2023, ISBN 978-3-031-19706-2)
297. Random Walks on Infinite Groups, Steven P. Lalley (2023, ISBN 978-3-031-25631-8)
298. More Explorations in Complex Functions, Richard Beals, Roderick S.C. Wong (2023, ISBN 978-3-031-28287-4)
299. Continuous Parameter Markov Processes and Stochastic Differential Equations, Rabi Bhattacharya, Edward C. Waymire (2023, ISBN 978-3-031-33294-4)
300. An Introduction to Automorphic Representations, Jayce R. Getz, Heekyoung Hahn (2024, ISBN 978-3-031-41151-9)
301. An Invitation to Mathematical Logic, David Marker (2024, ISBN 978-3-031-55367-7)
302. Fundamentals of Fourier Analysis, Loukas Grafakos (2024, ISBN 978-3-031-56499-4)
303. A Course in Real Algebraic Geometry, Claus Scheiderer (2024, ISBN 978-3-031-69212-3)
304. An Introduction to Microlocal Analysis, Peter Hintz (2025, ISBN 978-3-031-90705-0)
305. Complex Analysis in One Variable and Riemann Surfaces, Mei-Chi Shaw, Charles M. Stanton (2025, ISBN 978-3-031-93641-8)
306. Metric Lie Groups: Carnot-Carathéodory Spaces from the Homogeneous Viewpoint, Enrico Le Donne (2025, ISBN 978-3-031-98831-8)
307. From Classical L-Functions to Modern Reciprocity Laws, Claus Sorensen (2025, ISBN 978-3-032-03034-4)
308. Unitary Representations and Unitary Duals, Manfred Einsiedler, Thomas Ward (2025, ISBN 978-3-032-03898-2)
309. Commutative Algebra, Shiro Goto, Kei-ichi Watanabe (2025, ISBN 978-981-95-4226-0)
310. Calculus of Variations, Filip Rindler (2026, ISBN 978-3-032-24482-6)
311. Fourier Decoupling Theory, Shaoming Guo (2026, ISBN 978-3-032-38326-6)

== See also ==
- Graduate Studies in Mathematics
