= Vern Paulsen =

American mathematician

Vern Ival Paulsen
- Born: 1951 (age 74–75)

Academic background
- Education: Western Michigan University; University of Michigan
- Thesis: Weak Compalence Invariants for Essentially N-Normal Operators (1977)
- Doctoral advisor: Carl Pearcy

Academic work
- Institutions: University of Kansas; University of Houston; University of Waterloo
- Website: uwaterloo.ca/institute-for-quantum-computing/profiles/vern-paulsen

Vern Ival Paulsen (born 1951) is an American mathematician, focusing in operator theory, operator algebras, frame theory, C*-algebras, and quantum information theory.

== Education and career ==
Paulsen studied mathematics at Western Michigan University, obtaining a BA in 1973. He then moved to University of Michigan and obtained his Ph.D. in mathematics under Carl Pearcy in 1977. He spent the following two years at University of Kansas as an instructor. Since 1979, he has been a faculty member in the Department of Mathematics at University of Houston. He was since 1996 the John and Rebecca Moores Professor at the University of Houston.

In 2015, Paulsen moved to Canada and became a professor in the department of pure mathematics at the Institute for Quantum Computing and at the University of Waterloo.

== Bibliography ==
- Douglas, Ronald G.; Paulsen, Vern I. (1989). Hilbert modules over function algebras. Harlow, Essex, England: Longman Scientific & Technical. ISBN 0-470-21478-3. OCLC 19672811.
- Blecher, David P.; Muhly, Paul S.; Paulsen, Vern I. (2000). Categories of operator modules : Morita equivalence and projective modules. Providence, R.I.: American Mathematical Society. ISBN 978-1-4704-0272-3. OCLC 851088821.
- Paulsen, Vern I. (2003). Completely bounded maps and operator algebras. Cambridge: Cambridge University Press. ISBN 0-511-06103-X. OCLC 228110971.
- Gupta, Ved Prakash (2015). The functional analysis of quantum information theory : a collection of notes based on lectures by Gilles Pisier, K.R. Parthasarathy, Vern Paulsen and Andreas Winter. Prabha Mandayam, V. S. Sunder. Cham. ISBN 978-3-319-16718-3. OCLC 910663209.
- Paulsen, Vern I.; Raghupathi, Mrinal (2016). An introduction to the theory of reproducing kernel Hilbert spaces. Cambridge: Cambridge University Press. ISBN 978-1-107-10409-9. OCLC 924626167.

== See also ==
- Ronald G. Douglas
