= Paul Muhly =

American mathematician

Paul S. Muhly
- Born: 7 September 1944 (age 81)
- Education: University of Michigan, Ph.D. (1969)
- Scientific career
- Fields: Mathematics, Operator Algebras, Operator Theory, Noncommutative Function Theory, Theory of Groupoids
- Institutions: University of Iowa
- Thesis: Commutants Containing a Compact Operator (1969)
- Doctoral advisor: Ronald Douglas
- Website: https://math.uiowa.edu/people/paul-muhly

Paul Muhly (born September 7, 1944) is an American mathematician. In 2015 he was elected as a Fellow of the American Mathematical Society for his contributions to operator theory as well as mentoring and service to the community. He has supervised over 20 Ph.D. students.
