= Tanja Eisner =

Ukrainian-born German mathematician

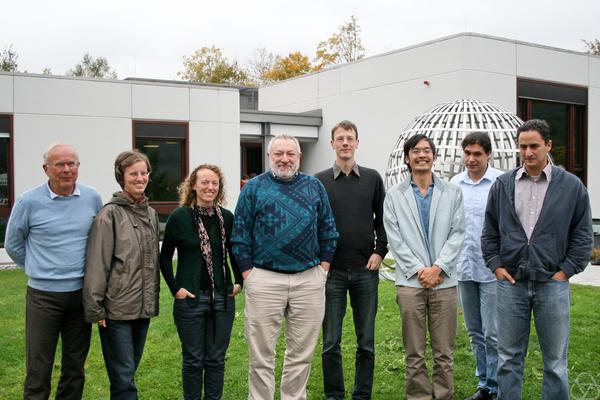
From left: Rainer Nagel, Tanja Eisner, Tamar Ziegler, Vitaly Bergelson, Markus Haase, Terence C. Tao, Balint Farkas, and Nikos Frantzikinakis, at the 2012 MFO Study Group Ergodic Theory and Combinatorial Number Theory

Tatjana (Tanja) Eisner (née Lobova, born 1980) is a German and Ukrainian mathematician specializing in functional analysis, operator theory as well as ergodic theory and its connection to number theory. She is a professor of mathematics at Leipzig University.

== Education and career ==
Eisner was born on 1 July 1980 in Kharkiv, but has German citizenship. She earned a diploma in applied mathematics in 2002 from the National University of Kharkiv, with a diploma thesis supervised by Anna Vishnyakova. She then earned a diploma in mathematics at the University of Tübingen in 2004, followed by a Ph.D. in 2007. Her dissertation, Stability of Operators and $C_0$-Semigroups, was supervised by Rainer Nagel.

From 2007 to 2010, Eisner worked as a scientific assistant at the University of Tübingen. After her habilitation in 2010 in Tübingen she was an assistant professor at the University of Amsterdam from 2011 to 2013 before joining Leipzig University as a full professor in 2013.

== Books ==
Eisner is the author of the book Stability of Operators and Operator Semigroups (Operator Theory: Advances and Applications, Vol. 209, Birkhäuser, 2010). She is a coauthor of Operator Theoretic Aspects of Ergodic Theory (with Bálint Farkas, Markus Haase, Rainer Nagel, Graduate Texts in Mathematics 272, Springer, 2015).
