= Alfred van der Poorten =

Dutch-Australian number theorist

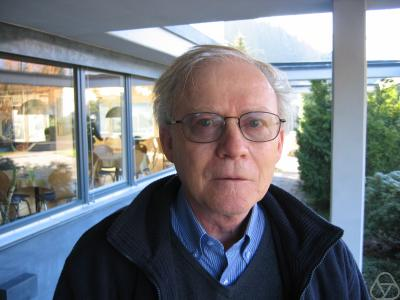
Alfred van der Poorten in Oberwolfach, 2004

Alfred Jacobus (Alf) van der Poorten AM (16 May 1942 – 9 October 2010) was a Dutch-Australian number theorist, for many years on the mathematics faculties of the University of New South Wales and Macquarie University.

== Biography ==
Van der Poorten was born into a Jewish family in Amsterdam in 1942, after the German occupation began. His parents, David and Marianne van der Poorten, gave him into foster care with the Teerink family in Amersfoort, under the name "Fritsje"; the senior van der Poortens went into hiding, were caught by the Nazis, survived the concentration camps, and were reunited with van der Poorten and his two sisters after the war. The family moved to Sydney in 1951, travelling there aboard the SS Himalaya.

Van der Poorten studied at Sydney Boys High School from 1955 to 1959, and earned a high score in the Leaving Certificate Examination there. He spent a year in Israel and then studied mathematics at the University of New South Wales, where he earned a bachelor's degree in 1965, a doctorate in 1968 under the joint supervision of George Szekeres and Kurt Mahler, and a Master of Business Administration. While a student at UNSW, he led the student union council and was president of the University Union, as well as helping to lead several Jewish and Zionist student organisations. He also helped to manage the university's cooperative bookstore, where he met and in 1972 married another bookstore manager, Joy FitzRoy.

On finishing his studies in 1969, van der Poorten joined the UNSW faculty as a lecturer in pure mathematics. He became senior lecturer in 1972 and associate professor in 1976. In 1979 he moved to Macquarie University to become full professor and head of the School of Mathematics, Physics, Computing and Electronics, an administrative role that he served until 1987 and then resumed from 1991 to 1996. From 1991 onwards he also directed the Centre for Number Theory Research at Macquarie. He retired in 2002.

In 1973, van der Poorten founded the Australian Mathematical Society Gazette, and he continued to edit it until 1977. He was elected president of the Australian Mathematical Society in 1996.

Van der Poorten was also active in science fiction fandom, beginning in the mid-1960s. He was an early member of the Sydney Science Fiction Foundation, attended the first SynCon in 1970, became friends with Locus publisher Charles N. Brown and (with psychologist Tom Newlyn) was known as one of "Sydney's terrible twins". His fannish activities significantly lessened by the late 1970s, but as late as 1999 he was a member of the 57th World Science Fiction Convention in Sydney where he helped operate the Locus table.

== Research ==
Van der Poorten was the author of approximately 180 publications in number theory, on subjects that included Baker's theorem, continued fractions, elliptic curves, regular languages, the integer sequences derived from recurrence relations, and transcendental numbers. Some of his significant results include the 1988 solution of Pisot's conjecture on the rationality of Hadamard quotients of rational functions, his 1992 work with Bernard Dwork on the Eisenstein constant, his work with Enrico Bombieri on Diophantine approximation of algebraic numbers, and his 1999 paper with Kenneth Stuart Williams on the Chowla–Selberg formula. He had many co-authors, the most frequent being his colleague John H. Loxton, who joined the UNSW faculty in 1972 and who later like van der Poorten moved to Macquarie.

As well as publishing his own research, van der Poorten was noted for his expository writings, among them a paper on Apéry's theorem on the irrationality of ζ(3) and his book on Fermat's Last Theorem.

== Awards and honours ==
Van der Poorten received the Australian Youth Citizenship Award in 1966 for his student leadership activities. He became a member of the Order of Australia in 2004.

With Ian Sloan, van der Poorten was awarded one of two of the inaugural George Szekeres Medals of the Australian Mathematical Society in 2002, and he became an honorary member of the society in 2009.

== Selected publications ==
- van der Poorten, Alfred (1979), "A proof that Euler missed...Apéry's proof of the irrationality of ζ(3)", The Mathematical Intelligencer, 1 (4): 195–203, doi:10.1007/BF03028234, MR 0547748, S2CID 121589323.
- van der Poorten, Alfred J. (1988), "Solution de la conjecture de Pisot sur le quotient de Hadamard de deux fractions rationnelles", Comptes Rendus des Séances de l'Académie des Sciences, Série I, Mathématique (in French), 306 (3): 97–102, MR 0929097.
- Dwork, Bernard M.; van der Poorten, Alfred J. (1992), "The Eisenstein constant", Duke Mathematical Journal, 65 (1): 23–43, doi:10.1215/S0012-7094-92-06502-1, MR 1148984. Corrected in Duke Math. J. 76 (2): 669–672, 1994, MR 1302329.
- van der Poorten, Alf (1996), Notes on Fermat's Last Theorem, Canadian Mathematical Society Series of Monographs and Advanced Texts, New York: John Wiley & Sons Inc., ISBN 0-471-06261-8, MR 1373197.
- van der Poorten, Alfred; Williams, Kenneth S. (1999), "Values of the Dedekind eta function at quadratic irrationalities", Canadian Journal of Mathematics, 51 (1): 176–224, doi:10.4153/CJM-1999-011-1, MR 1692895, S2CID 121949386. Corrected in Can. J. Math. 53 (2): 434–438, 2001, MR 1820916.
- Co-authored Recurrence Sequences with Graham Everest, Thomas Ward, and Igor Shparlinski: American Math. Society (2003)
