= Joel Shapiro (mathematician) =

American mathematician

- Education: University of Michigan (PhD); Case Institute of Technology
- Known for: Functional analysis, Operator Theory, Composition Operators
- Scientific career
- Fields: Mathematics
- Workplaces: Queen's University, Canada; Michigan State University; Portland State University
- Thesis: Linear functionals on non-locally convex spaces. (1969)
- Doctoral advisor: Allen Shields
- Doctoral students: Barbara MacCluer

Joel H. Shapiro is an American mathematician, active in the field of composition operators. He is the author of the book Composition Operators and Classical Function Theory, and the American Mathematical Society memoir "Cyclic Phenomena for Composition Operators" (Memoirs of the American Math. Society #596, Vol. 125, 1997, pp. 1–105), with Paul Bourdon.

== Career ==
Shapiro completed his PhD thesis entitled "Linear Functionals on Non-Locally Convex Spaces" under the supervision of Allen Shields in 1969 at the University of Michigan. Upon graduating, he became a research associate at Queen's University, Canada, then from 1970 onwards was at Michigan State University, becoming a full professor in 1979. He stayed at Michigan State until 2006, when he retired and became an adjunct professor at Portland State University in Oregon.

Shapiro discovered some of the properties of composition operators, including a study of the cyclic properties of such operators and the first calculations of the essential norm for composition operators on the Hardy spaces of the Unit disc.
