= Barbara MacCluer =

American mathematician

Barbara Diane MacCluer is an American mathematician. She is a former professor of mathematics at the University of Virginia and now a professor emeritus there. Her research specialty is in operator theory and composition operators. She is known for the books she has written on this subject and related areas of functional analysis.

== Education and career ==
MacCluer is the daughter of George M. Richards, a research chemist and attorney. She is married to mathematician Thomas Kriete. She graduated from Michigan State University in 1975 and earned her Ph.D. there in 1983. Her dissertation, Holomorphic Self-Maps of the Unit Ball: Iteration and Composition Operators, was supervised by Joel Shapiro.

She worked at the University of Virginia from 1983 to 1986, at the University of South Carolina from 1986 to 1987 and at the University of Richmond from 1987 to 1995. She returned to the University of Virginia in 1995.

== Books ==
MacCluer is the author and editor of:

- Composition Operators on Spaces of Analytic Functions (CRC, 1995, with Carl C. Cowen)
- Studies on Composition Operators (American Mathematical Society, Contemporary Mathematics 213, 1998, edited with F. Jafari, C. Cowen, and A. D. Porter)
- Elementary Functional Analysis (Springer, Graduate Texts in Mathematics 253, 2009)
- Differential Equations: Techniques, Theory, and Applications (American Mathematical Society, 2020, with Paul S. Bourdon and Thomas L. Kriete)
