= Lionel Cooper (mathematician) =

South African mathematician

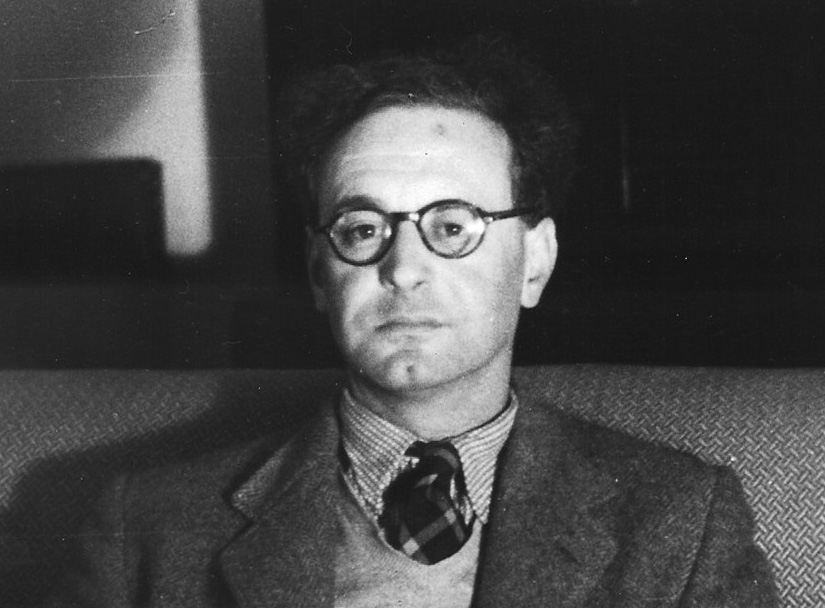
- JLB Cooper, c.1960
- Born: 27 December 1915; Beaufort West, Western Cape, South Africa
- Died: 8 August 1979 (aged 63); London, England
- Education: University of Cape Town; Queen's College, Oxford
- Awards: Berwick Prize (1949)
- Scientific career
- Fields: operator theory, transform theory, thermodynamics, functional analysis and differential equations
- Workplaces: Birkbeck College; Imperial College; Cardiff University; University of Witwatersrand; Caltech; University of Toronto; Chelsea College, University of London
- Doctoral advisor: Edward Titchmarsh
- Doctoral students: R. E. Edwards; James Stewart

Jacob Lionel Bakst Cooper (27 December 1915 – 8 August 1979) was a South African mathematician who worked in operator theory, transform theory, thermodynamics, functional analysis and differential equations.

== Development ==
Cooper was born in Beaufort West, Western Cape, South Africa. Following the death of his father in 1919, the family moved to Cape Town where he attended the South African College School. His ability was soon recognized and he was encouraged to become a rabbi. However he rejected the Jewish faith and instead studied mathematics and physics at the University of Cape Town, where he won the Governor General's prize for pure mathematics. He took an active part in student politics becoming a socialist member of the Student's Parliament, with strong views against racism and Nazism.

He won a Rhodes Scholarship to Oxford and started to study at Queen's College in 1935, obtaining his D.Phil. in 1940 under the supervision of Edward Charles Titchmarsh. His work made an immediate impact and as early as January 1939 he was invited to speak at Hadamard's seminar in the Collège de France.

While in Oxford he joined the Communist party, where he met his future wife Kathleen Dixon. Turned down for active service due to his poor eyesight, he worked for the Bristol Aeroplane Company from 1940 to 1944. During this time he became disenchanted with Russia's non-aggression pact with the Nazis and left the Communist party.

== Academic career ==
From 1944 he lectured at Birkbeck College and for a short time Imperial College, and was awarded the Berwick Prize in 1949. His correspondence of that year included two letters from Albert Einstein concerning possible logical inconsistencies in quantum mechanics.

In 1951 he was appointed professor at the Cardiff University where he stayed until 1963 apart from a break in 1954 when he spent some time in the University of Witwatersrand. From 1952 to 1959 he edited the proceedings of the London Mathematical Society. After leaving Cardiff he spent three years in North America, as visiting professor at Caltech during 1964, followed by a two-year stay at the University of Toronto. While in Toronto he edited the Canadian Journal of Mathematics.

In 1967 he returned to the UK to serve as head of the mathematics department at the newly constituted Chelsea College, University of London, where he remained until his death.

== Mathematics ==
Within operator theory, Cooper worked in the area of linear operators on real or complex Hilbert spaces. He studied the unbounded operators that arose from quantum theory, extending basic work of Frigyes Riesz and John von Neumann.

Within transform theory, he worked on the representation and uniqueness of integral transforms, on approximation, and on linear transformations that satisfy functional relations arising from representations of linear groups. In this he collaborated closely with P.L. Butzer of RWTH Aachen.
