= Michał Wojtylak =

- Citizenship: Polish
- Scientific career
- Fields: control theory, operator theory
- Workplaces: Jagiellonian University, TU Berlin

Michał Wojtylak is a Polish professor of control theory and operator theory. He is the head of the Department of Functional Analysis at the Faculty of Mathematics and Computer Science of Jagiellonian University.

== Biography ==
Wojtylak earned a master's degree in mathematics from Jagiellonian University in 2003. In 2007, he completed his Ph.D. in mathematics under the supervision of Jan Stochel. Between 2012 and 2014, he was a postdoctoral researcher at Berlin University of Technology, where in 2015 he obtained his habilitation for his thesis Analysis of spectra of operators and matrices in indefinite inner product spaces. In 2016, he obtained his habilitation from his alma mater, Jagiellonian University. In 2026, he was awarded the academic title of professor by the President of Poland. He is currently a professor at Jagiellonian University and the head of the Department of Functional Analysis.

He has published articles in SIAM Journal on Matrix Analysis and Applications, Journal of Functional Analysis, Journal of Mathematical Analysis and Applications, Electronic Communications in Probability, Linear Algebra and Its Applications, and Integral Equations and Operator Theory.
