= Allen Shields =

American mathematician (1927–1989)

- Born: Allen Lowell Shields; May 7, 1927; New York, U.S.
- Died: September 16, 1989 (aged 62); Ann Arbor, Michigan, U.S.
- Education: City College of New York (BS); Massachusetts Institute of Technology (PhD)
- Scientific career
- Fields: Mathematics
- Institutions: University of Michigan
- Thesis: On Additive Properties of Real Numbers (1952)
- Doctoral advisor: Witold Hurewicz
- Other academic advisors: Raphaël Salem
- Doctoral students: Theodore Kaczynski; Joel Shapiro; Russell Lyons

Allen Lowell Shields (May 7, 1927 – September 16, 1989) was an American mathematician who worked on measure theory, complex analysis, functional analysis and operator theory, and was "one of the world's leading authorities on spaces of analytic functions".

Shields was a student of Witold Hurewicz.

A special issue of The Mathematical Intelligencer, for which he served as editor of the "Years Ago" column, was dedicated to his memory in 1990.

== Notable students ==
Shields directed a large number of doctoral dissertations, including the 1967 PhD thesis of Theodore Kaczynski, the future "Unabomber", titled "Boundary Functions".
