= Lionel Cooper =

Lionel Cooper may refer to:

- Lionel Cooper (rugby league) (1923–1987), Australian rugby league footballer
- Lionel Cooper (mathematician) (1915–1979), South African mathematician
