= Ronald G. Douglas =

American mathematician

Ronald George Douglas
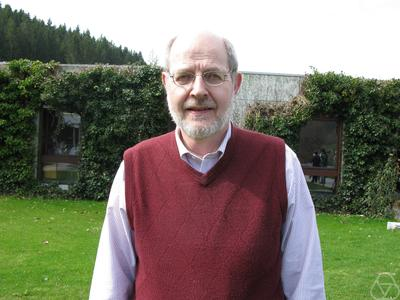
- Born: December 10, 1938; Osgood, Indiana, USA
- Died: February 27, 2018 (aged 79); College Station, Texas, USA
- Occupation: Mathematician
- Known for: Douglas-Arveson conjecture Douglas' lemma

Academic background
- Education: Illinois Institute of Technology; Louisiana State University
- Doctoral advisor: Pasquale Porcelli

Academic work
- Institutions: University of Michigan; Stony Brook University; Texas A&M University
- Doctoral students: Paul Muhly; Guoliang Yu; Gadadhar Misra

Ronald George Douglas (December 10, 1938 – February 27, 2018) was an American mathematician, best known for his work on operator theory and operator algebras.

== Education and career ==
Douglas was born in Osgood, Indiana. He was an undergraduate at the Illinois Institute of Technology, and received his Ph.D. in 1962 from Louisiana State University as a student of Pasquale Porcelli. He was at the University of Michigan until 1969, when he moved to the State University of New York at Stony Brook. Beginning in 1986 he moved into university administration, eventually becoming Vice Provost at Stony Brook in 1990, and Provost at Texas A&M University from 1996 until 2002. At the time of his death, he was Distinguished Professor in the Department of Mathematics at Texas A&M. He is survived by three children, including Michael R. Douglas, a noted string theorist.

== Research ==
Among his best-known contributions to science is a 1977 paper with Lawrence G. Brown and Peter A. Fillmore (BDF theory), which introduced techniques from algebraic topology into the theory of operator algebras. This work was an important precursor to noncommutative geometry as later developed by Alain Connes among others. In addition to BDF theory, two other influential theories bear his names: Douglas algebra and Cowen-Douglas operators. In recent decades, he was a prominent advocator of multivariable operator theory. His coauthored book with Vern Paulsen "Hilbert modules over function algebras" introduced an analytic framework for studying commuting operator tuples. Douglas-Arveson conjecture is a well-known unsolved problem in this field.

Douglas directed 23 Ph.D. students, some of whom became renowned mathematicians, and his book Banach Algebra Techniques in Operator Theory in the series Graduate Texts in Mathematics is one of the classics in operator theory.

== Honors and awards ==
In 2012, he became a fellow of the American Mathematical Society.

== See also ==
- Douglas' lemma
