= Douglas' lemma =

In operator theory, an area of mathematics, Douglas' lemma relates factorization, range inclusion, and majorization of Hilbert space operators. It is generally attributed to Ronald G. Douglas, although Douglas acknowledges that aspects of the result may already have been known. The statement of the result is as follows:

Theorem: If $A$ and $B$ are bounded operators on a Hilbert space $H$, the following are equivalent:

1. $\operatorname{range} A \subseteq \operatorname{range} B$
2. $AA^* \leq \lambda^2 BB^*$ for some $\lambda \geq 0$
3. There exists a bounded operator $C$ on $H$ such that $A=BC$.

Moreover, if these equivalent conditions hold, then there is a unique operator $C$ such that

- $\Vert C \Vert^2 = \inf \{\mu :\, AA^* \leq \mu BB^*\}$
- $\ker A = \ker C$
- $\operatorname{range} C \subseteq \overline {\operatorname{range} B^*}$.

A generalization of Douglas' lemma for unbounded operators on a Banach space was proved by Forough (2014).

== See also ==
- Positive operator
