= Sidney Graham =

American mathematician

- Born: August 29, 1950 (age 76); Oklahoma, US
- Education: University of Michigan
- Scientific career
- Fields: Mathematics
- Workplaces: Central Michigan University, University of Texas-Austin, Michigan Technological University, National Science Foundation
- Doctoral advisor: Hugh Montgomery

Sidney West Graham is a mathematician interested in analytic number theory and professor at Central Michigan University. He received his Ph.D., which was supervised by Hugh Montgomery, from the University of Michigan in 1977. In his Ph.D. thesis he lowered the upper bound for Linnik's constant to 36 and subsequently reduced the bound further to 20.
