= Robert Edmund Edwards =

British–Australian mathematician

Robert Edmund Edwards (1926–2000), usually cited simply as R. E. Edwards, was a British-born Australian mathematician who specialized in functional analysis. He is the author of several volumes in Springer's Graduate Texts in Mathematics.

He received his PhD at Birkbeck College, University of London in 1951 under Lionel Cooper. His dissertation topic was Theory of Normed Rings, and Translations in Function Spaces. He continued to teach there as a lecturer until 1959, and then spent a few years at Manchester, before migrating to Australia in 1961, where he worked at the Institute of Advanced Studies at ANU as a professorial fellow (1961-1970) and professor of mathematics (1970-1978).

== Selected publications ==
- Functional Analysis: Theory and Applications. Holt, Rinehart, and Winston, 1965; revised edition Dover Publications, 1995; ISBN 0-486-68143-2.
- with Garth Ian Gaudry: Littlewood-Paley and multiplier theory. Springer-Verlag, Ergebnisse der Mathematik und ihrer Grenzgebiete, vol. 90, 1977. 2012 pbk reprint
- A Formal Background to Mathematics: Volume 1, Logic, Sets and Numbers. Springer-Verlag, 1979; ISBN 978-0-387-90431-3.
- A Formal Background to Mathematics: Volume 2, A Critical Approach to Elementary Analysis. Springer-Verlag, 1980; ISBN 978-0-387-90513-6.
- Graduate Texts in Mathematics: Fourier Series, A Modern Introduction. Volumes 1 and 2. Holt, Rinehart, and Winston, 1967; 2nd edition, Springer-Verlag, 1982; ISBN 978-1-4613-8158-7.
- Integration and Harmonic Analysis on Compact Groups. Cambridge University Press, 1972; ISBN 978-0-521-09717-8.
