= Linnik's theorem =

Mathematical theorem

Linnik's theorem in analytic number theory answers a natural question after Dirichlet's theorem on arithmetic progressions. It asserts that there exist positive c and L such that, if we denote p(a,d) the least prime in the arithmetic progression

$$a + nd,\$$

where n runs through the positive integers and a and d are any given positive coprime integers with 1 ≤ a ≤ d − 1, then:

$$\operatorname{p}(a,d) < c d^{L}. \;$$

The theorem is named after Yuri Vladimirovich Linnik, who proved it in 1944. Although Linnik's proof showed c and L to be effectively computable, he provided no numerical values for them.

It follows from Zsigmondy's theorem that p(1,d) ≤ 2^{d} − 1, for all d ≥ 3. It is known that p(1,p) ≤ L_{p}, for all primes p ≥ 5, as L_{p} is congruent to 1 modulo p for all prime numbers p, where L_{p} denotes the p-th Lucas number. Just like Mersenne numbers, Lucas numbers with prime indices have divisors of the form 2kp+1.

== Properties ==
It is known that L ≤ 2 for almost all integers d.

On the generalized Riemann hypothesis it can be shown that

$$\operatorname{p}(a,d) \leq (1+o(1))\varphi(d)^2 (\log d)^2 \; ,$$

where $\varphi$ is the totient function, and the stronger bound

$$\operatorname{p}(a,d) \leq \varphi(d)^2 (\log d)^2 \; ,$$

has been also proved.

It is also conjectured that:

$\operatorname{p}(a,d) < d^2. \;$

== Bounds for L ==
The constant L is called Linnik's constant and the following table shows the progress that has been made on determining its size.

| L ≤ | Year of publication | Author |
| 10000 | 1957 | Pan |
| 5448 | 1958 | Pan |
| 777 | 1965 | Chen |
| 630 | 1971 | Jutila |
| 550 | 1970 | Jutila |
| 168 | 1977 | Chen |
| 80 | 1977 | Jutila |
| 36 | 1977 | Graham |
| 20 | 1981 | Graham (submitted before Chen's 1979 paper) |
| 17 | 1979 | Chen |
| 16 | 1986 | Wang |
| 13.5 | 1989 | Chen and Liu |
| 8 | 1990 | Wang |
| 5.5 | 1992 | Heath-Brown |
| 5.18 | 2009 | Xylouris |
| 5 | 2011 | Xylouris |
| 5 − ε | 2018 | Xylouris |
| 3.99 | 2026 | Naslund (work done with AI) |

Moreover, in Heath-Brown's result the constant c is effectively computable.
