= John C. Oxtoby =

American mathematician

John C. Oxtoby (1910–1991) was an American mathematician. In 1936, he graduated with a Master of Science in mathematics from Harvard University. He was a professor of mathematics at Bryn Mawr College in Pennsylvania from 1939 until his retirement in 1979.

== Works ==
- John C. Oxtoby (1971). Measure and Category: A Survey of the Analogies Between Topological and Measure Spaces. Graduate Texts in Mathematics. Vol. 2. Springer. ISBN 978-0-387-05349-3.
