= Gerd Grubb =

Danish mathematician (born 1939)

Gerd Grubb (born 12 February 1939) is a Danish mathematician known for her research on pseudo-differential operators. She is a professor emerita in the Department of Mathematical Sciences at the University of Copenhagen, where she was the first female professor of mathematics.

== Education and career ==
Grubb was born on 12 February 1939 in Copenhagen, the daughter of two chemical engineers. She was a student at the Øregård Gymnasium, and then studied various sciences at the University of Copenhagen from 1956 until 1959. After earning a master's degree in mathematics at Aarhus University in 1963, she went to Stanford University for doctoral study in mathematics, completing a Ph.D. in 1966. Her dissertation, A Characterization of the Non-Local Boundary Value Problems Associated With an Elliptic Operator, was supervised by Ralph S. Phillips. She completed a habilitation (Dr. Phil.) in 1975 at the University of Copenhagen, with the habilitation thesis Semiboundedness and other properties of normal boundary problems for elliptic partial differential operators.

She returned to the University of Copenhagen as an assistant professor in 1966, eventually becoming a full professor there in 1994.

== Books ==
Grubb is the author of the books Functional calculus of pseudodifferential boundary problems (Progress in Mathematics 65, Birkhäuser, 1986; 2nd ed., 1996) and Distributions and operators (Graduate Texts in Mathematics 252, Springer, 2009).

== Recognition ==
Grubb is a member of the Danish Academy of Natural Sciences. The University of Reims Champagne-Ardenne gave her an honorary doctorate in 1988. She was promoted to hedersdoktor (an honorary doctorate) at the University of Lund (Sweden) in 2016. In 2020, she received the Gold Medal of the Royal Danish Academy of Sciences and Letters.
