= Michael E. Taylor =

American mathematician

- Born: 1946 (age 79–80)
- Education: Princeton University (BA); University of California, Berkeley (PhD)
- Spouse: Jane M. Hawkins
- Scientific career
- Fields: Mathematics
- Workplaces: University of North Carolina at Chapel Hill
- Thesis: Hypoelliptic differential equations (1970)
- Doctoral advisor: Heinz Otto Cordes

Michael Eugene Taylor (born 1946) is an American mathematician working in partial differential equations.

== Biography ==
Taylor obtained his bachelor's degree from Princeton University in 1967, and completed his Ph.D. under the supervision of Heinz Otto Cordes at the University of California, Berkeley (Hypoelliptic Differential Equations). He held a professorship at the State University of New York at Stony Brook and is now the William R. Kenan Professor of Mathematics at the University of North Carolina at Chapel Hill.

In 1986 he was awarded the Lester Randolph Ford Award. In 2026 he was awarded the Leroy P. Steele Prize for Mathematical Exposition.

He is a member of the American Academy of Arts and Sciences. In 1990 he was invited speaker at the International Congress of Mathematicians in Kyoto (Microlocal analysis in spectral and scattering theory and index theory). He is a fellow of the American Mathematical Society.

He is married to mathematician Jane M. Hawkins.

== Notable publications ==
Books.

- Michael E. Taylor. Pseudodifferential operators. Princeton Mathematical Series, 34. Princeton University Press, Princeton, N.J., 1981. xi+452 pp. ISBN 0-691-08282-0
- Michael E. Taylor. Noncommutative harmonic analysis. Mathematical Surveys and Monographs, 22. American Mathematical Society, Providence, RI, 1986. xvi+328 pp. ISBN 0-8218-1523-7
- Michael E. Taylor. Pseudodifferential operators and nonlinear PDE. Progress in Mathematics, 100. Birkhäuser Boston, Inc., Boston, MA, 1991. 213 pp. ISBN 0-8176-3595-5
- Michael E. Taylor. Tools for PDE. Pseudodifferential operators, paradifferential operators, and layer potentials. Mathematical Surveys and Monographs, 81. American Mathematical Society, Providence, RI, 2000. x+257 pp. ISBN 0-8218-2633-6
- Michael E. Taylor. Measure theory and integration. Graduate Studies in Mathematics, 76. American Mathematical Society, Providence, RI, 2006. xiv+319 pp. ISBN 978-0-8218-4180-8, 0-8218-4180-7
- Michael E. Taylor. Introduction to differential equations. Pure and Applied Undergraduate Texts, 14. American Mathematical Society, Providence, RI, 2011. 409 pp. ISBN 978-0-8218-5271-2 2nd edition. ISBN 978-1-4704-6762-3.
- Michael E. Taylor. Partial differential equations I. Basic theory. Second edition. Applied Mathematical Sciences, 115. Springer, New York, 2011. xxii+654 pp. ISBN 978-1-4419-7054-1
- Michael E. Taylor. Partial differential equations II. Qualitative studies of linear equations. Second edition. Applied Mathematical Sciences, 116. Springer, New York, 2011. xxii+614 pp. ISBN 978-1-4419-7051-0
- Michael E. Taylor. Partial differential equations III. Nonlinear equations. Second edition. Applied Mathematical Sciences, 117. Springer, New York, 2011. xxii+715 pp. ISBN 978-1-4419-7048-0
- Dorina Mitrea, Irina Mitrea, Marius Mitrea, and Michael Taylor. The Hodge-Laplacian. Boundary value problems on Riemannian manifolds. De Gruyter Studies in Mathematics, 64. De Gruyter, Berlin, 2016. ix+516 pp. ISBN 978-3-11-048266-9, 978-3-11-048438-0, 978-3-11-048339-0
- Michael E. Taylor. Introduction to complex analysis. Graduate Studies in Mathematics, 202. American Mathematical Society, Providence, RI, 2019. xiv+480 pp. ISBN 978-1-4704-5286-5

Articles.

- Jeffrey Rauch and Michael Taylor. Exponential decay of solutions to hyperbolic equations in bounded domains. Indiana Univ. Math. J. 24 (1974), 79–86. doi:10.1512/iumj.1975.24.24004
- Jeff Cheeger, Mikhail Gromov, and Michael Taylor. Finite propagation speed, kernel estimates for functions of the Laplace operator, and the geometry of complete Riemannian manifolds. J. Differential Geom. 17 (1982), no. 1, 15–53. doi:10.4310/jdg/1214436699
- Dorina Mitrea, Marius Mitrea, and Michael Taylor. Layer potentials, the Hodge Laplacian, and global boundary problems in nonsmooth Riemannian manifolds. Mem. Amer. Math. Soc. 150 (2001), no. 713, x+120 pp. doi:10.1090/memo/0713
