= Ruth Barnett (Holocaust survivor) =

Holocaust survivor and educator

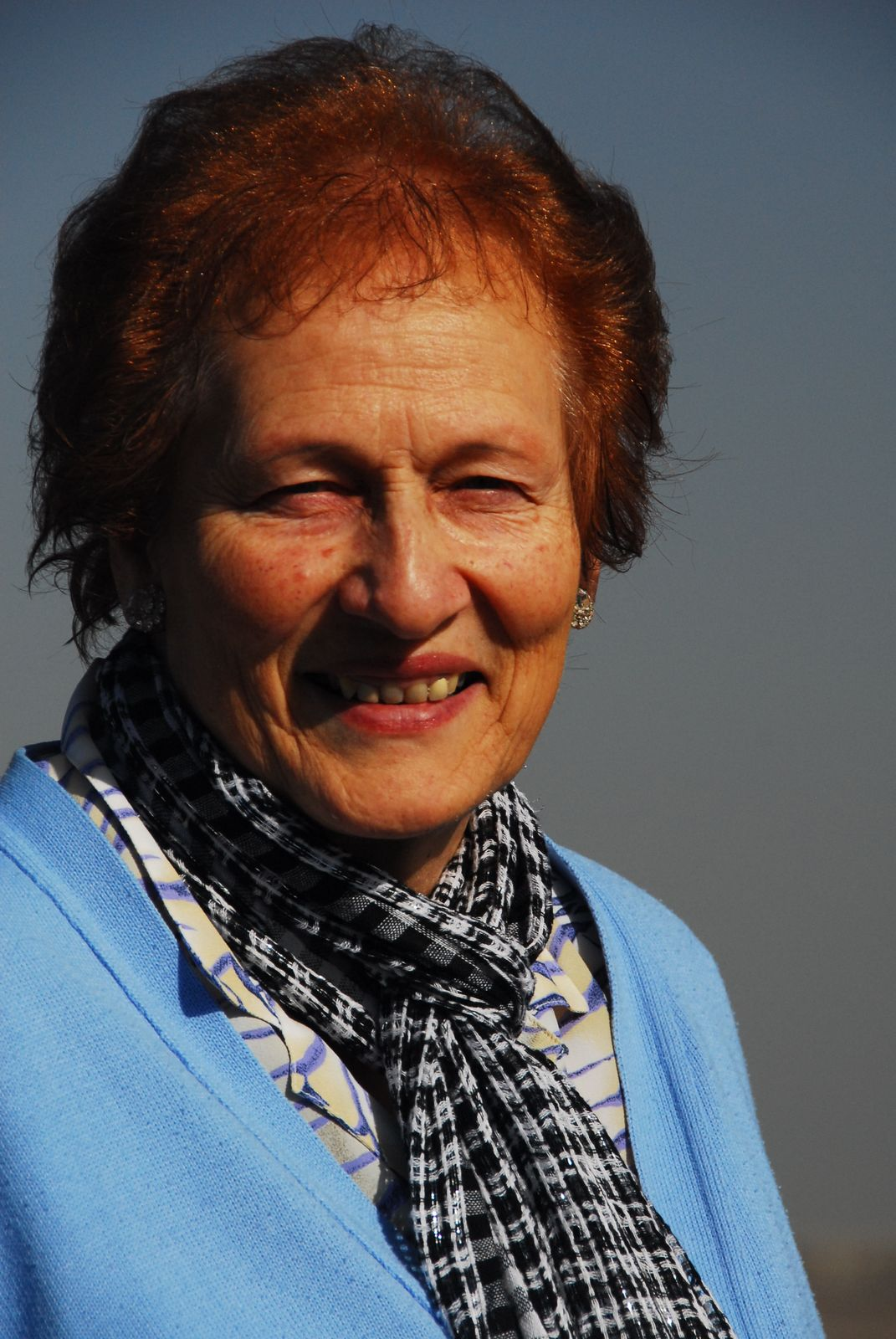
- Ruth Barnett in 2010
- Born: Ruth Emma Clara Louise Michaelis; 23 January 1935 Berlin, Germany
- Occupation: Writer; Teacher; Holocaust educator
- Genre: Holocaust literature
- Spouse: Bernard Barnett (m. 24 August 1958)

Ruth Emma Clara Louise Barnett MBE (née Michaelis; born 23 January 1935), is a Holocaust survivor and educator.

== Biography ==
Barnett was born in Berlin, Germany, to German citizens Robert Bernd Michaelis and Louise Marie Michaelis (Ventzke). Eight months later, under the Nuremberg Laws, she lost her German citizenship because her father was born Jewish. In 1939, at the age of four, she and her seven-year-old brother Martin travelled to Britain on the Kindertransport. The description "Person of no nationality" written into her British travel document remained with her until the age of 18, when she became eligible to apply for British citizenship. This description was later used as the title of her autobiographical account of her experiences, which was also translated into German in 2016.

Ruth attended several schools in England, but in interviews highlighted the impact of the period 1941 to 1943 as a boarding pupil at the Friends' School, Saffron Walden. She and her brother Martin attended the reunion in 1995 of the Friends' School pupils from the war years, and her story was recorded in the publication The School on the hill: memories of three hundred years of Friends' School, Saffron Walden, 1702–2002 edited by Hilary Riuth Halter in 2002 to celebrate the three hundredth anniversary of the founding of the school.

She studied at the University of Reading, where she met Bernard Raymond Barnett; they married in 1958. After working as a chemist in industry and as a teacher, where she wrote materials for a childcare course, Barnett became a psychotherapist, practising in London. Bertha Leverton, who had escaped Germany in the same way, organised a 50th anniversary reunion of Kindertransportees in London in June 1989. This brought together more than 1200 Kindertransportees and their families, from all over the world, and attending this event began the second phase of Barnett's activity.

As a first generation survivor of the Holocaust, Barnett began giving talks about her own experiences and the origins of other genocides. In her presentations and writing, she coined the term "genocide footprints", marks left by societies and individuals who fail to actively intervene to combat the precursors to genocide or who engage in denial after such events. Her writings on these topics include Jews and gypsies: myths and reality, a book that challenges the stereotypes and myths behind racism directed at Roma and Traveller Gypsies; the play What price for justice, examining the story of her father and his attempts to return to his role as a judge in an environment where former Nazi judges were able to sit in judgement over former Nazi victims returning to reclaim what they had lost; Quality and inequality: the value of life, exploring inequalities in the age of social media and information technology; and Why war?, a memoir about her parents and life in pre-war Berlin.

Barnett also contributed the article Therapeutic Aspects of Working Through the Trauma of the Kindertransport Experience to The Kindertransport to Britain 1938/39 (Yearbook of the Research Centre for German and Austrian Exile Studies, Volume: 13, 2012).

Barnett has contributed her story and reflections on genocide prevention in many different settings, including:

- A contribution to Remembering the Kindertransport: 80 years on at The Jewish Museum in 2018–19
- A series of interviews were filmed for "The Holocaust Explained" exhibition at the Wiener Holocaust Library
- A profile of her work with the Holocaust Educational Trust
- An interview and profile for the Association of Jewish Refugees
- An interview with Naomi Koppel for The Independent
- An interview with the Express & Star
- Speaking for the Council of Christians and Jews at Lambeth Palace

Her story has also appeared in books about the Kindertransport including I came alone by Bertha Leverton and Shmuel Lowensohn, The uprooted by Dorit Bader Whiteman, The Leaves Have Lost Their Trees by Dorothy Darke, and And the Policeman Smiled by Barry Turner.

Her work in Holocaust education was recognised with the award of an MBE in the 2020 New Years Honours list for services to Holocaust education and awareness.

== Personal life ==
Ruth Michaelis met Bernard Barnett at the University of Reading and they married in 1958. They have three children Bruce (1961), Barry (1963), and Tania (1965, married to Thomas Ward).
