= Heinz Otto Cordes =

German-American mathematician

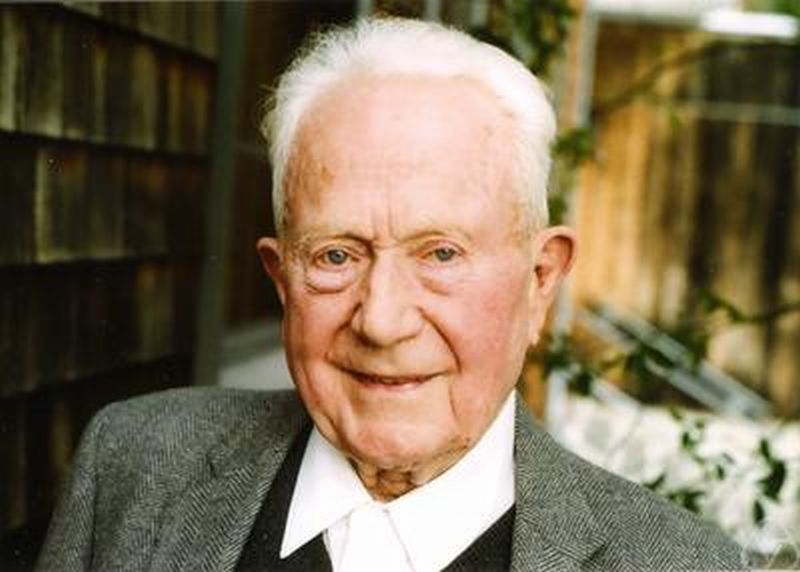
- Cordes in 2010
- Born: 18 March 1925; Westphalia
- Died: 30 October 2018 (aged 93)
- Occupation: Mathematician
- Spouse: Hilga Cordes (1995–2018)
- Children: 3

Heinz Otto Cordes (March 18, 1925 – October 30, 2018) was a German-American mathematician, specializing in partial differential equations (PDEs). He is known for the Aronszajn–Cordes uniqueness theorem for solutions of elliptic PDEs (due independently to Nachman Aronszajn).

== Biography ==
At the University of Göttingen, Cordes received in 1952 his doctorate. His doctoral dissertation, supervised by Franz Rellich, is entitled Separation von Variablen in Hilbertschen Raumen (Separation of variables in Hilbert spaces). Cordes held a junior academic appointment at Göttingen from 1952 to 1956, when he was appointed to an assistant professorship at the University of Southern California. At the University of California, Berkeley (UC Berkeley), he was an assistant professor to 1958 to 1959, an associate professor from 1959 to 1963, and a full professor from 1963 to 1991, when he retired as professor emeritus. In retirement he remained active in research.

Cordes made a number of significant contributions to the theory of PDEs. He also introduced C*-algebra techniques to define the symbol of elements of algebras of singular integral operators (as well as algebras of pseudodifferential operators). Thereby he extended the operator symbol calculus from compact manifolds to various classes of non-compact manifolds. This research led him to study Dirac operators with their connections with relativistic quantum mechanics. He was the author of 4 books and the author or co-author of more than 60 articles. From 1963 to 1999, he sometimes collaborated with Tosio Kato.

Cordes received an Alfred P. Sloan fellowship in 1959. He declined an invitation to address the International Congress of Mathematicians held in Moscow in 1966. For the academic year 1971–1972, Cordes was a visiting professor at Lund University, where he gave a course on pseudodifferential operators via a C*-algebra approach. His 19 doctoral students at UC Berkeley include Michael G. Crandall and Michael E. Taylor.

Upon his death in 2018, Heinz Cordes had been married to his wife Hillgia for 63 years. They were the parents of a son and two daughters.

== Selected publications ==
=== Articles ===
- Morrey, Charles B., ed. (1961). "Zero order a priori estimates for solutions of elliptic differential equations by H. O. Corders". Partial Differential Equations: Proceedings of the Fourth Symposium in Pure Mathematics of the American Mathematical Society. American Mathematical Soc. pp. 157–166. ISBN 9780821814048. preview at books.google.com
- Cordes, H. O.; Labrousse, J. P. (1963). "The Invariance of the Index in the Metric Space of Closed Operators". Journal of Mathematics and Mechanics. 12 (5): 693–719. JSTOR 24900877.
- Cordes, H. O.; Herman, E. A. (1968). "Gel'fand Theory of Pseudo Differential Operators". American Journal of Mathematics. 90 (3): 681–717. doi:10.2307/2373478. JSTOR 2373478.
- Cordes, H.O (1975). "On compactness of commutators of multiplications and convolutions, and boundedness of pseudodifferential operators". Journal of Functional Analysis. 18 (2): 115–131. doi:10.1016/0022-1236(75)90020-8.
- Cordes, H. O. (1979). "On pseudo-differential operators and smoothness of special Lie-group representations". Manuscripta Mathematica. 28 (1–3): 51–69. doi:10.1007/BF01647964. S2CID 121595687.
- Cordes, H. O.; Erkip, A. K. (1980). "The n-th Order Elliptic Boundary Problem for Noncompact Boundaries". The Rocky Mountain Journal of Mathematics. 10 (1): 7–24. doi:10.1216/RMJ-1980-10-1-7. JSTOR 44236508. S2CID 123206614.
- Cordes, Heinz O. (1983). "A pseudodifferential-Foldy-Wouthuysen transform". Communications in Partial Differential Equations. 8 (13): 1475–1485. doi:10.1080/03605308308820311.
- Cordes, H.O.; Tang, Tai-Ming (1991). "On the C^{*}-comparison algebra of a class of singular Sturm-Liouville expressions on the real line". Note di Matematica. 11: 93–108. doi:10.1285/i15900932v11p93.
- Cordes, H. O. (2004). "Symmetry Conditions on Dirac Observables" (PDF). Proceedings of Institute of Mathematics of NAS of Ukraine. 50, Part 2: 671–676.

=== Books ===
- Cordes, Heinz O. (1979). Elliptic Pseudo-differential Operators: An Abstract Theory. Lecture Notes in Mathematics 756. Springer. LCCN 79022996.
  - Cordes, Heinz O. (15 November 2006). 2006 pbk reprint. Springer. ISBN 9783540384632.
- Cordes, Heinz Otto (23 April 1987). Spectral Theory of Linear Differential Operators and Comparison Algebras. London Mathematical Society Lecture Note Series 76. Cambridge University Press. ISBN 9780521284431. LCCN 85047935.
- Cordes, Heinz Otto (23 February 1995). The Technique of Pseudodifferential Operators. London Mathematical Society Lecture Note Series 202. Cambridge University Press. pp. xii+382 pages. ISBN 9780521378642. LCCN 94023462.
- Cordes, Heinz Otto (10 January 2007). Precisely Predictable Dirac Observables. Fundamental Theories of Physics 154. Springer. ISBN 9781402051692. LCCN 2007425740; xx+268 pages

=== as editor ===
- Cordes, H. O.; Gramsch, Bernhard; Widom, Harold, eds. (1987). Pseudo-differential operators: proceedings of a conference held in Oberwolfach, February 2-8, 1986. Berlin; New York: Springer Verlag.
