= Alan Howard Ward =

British physicist (1925–2021)

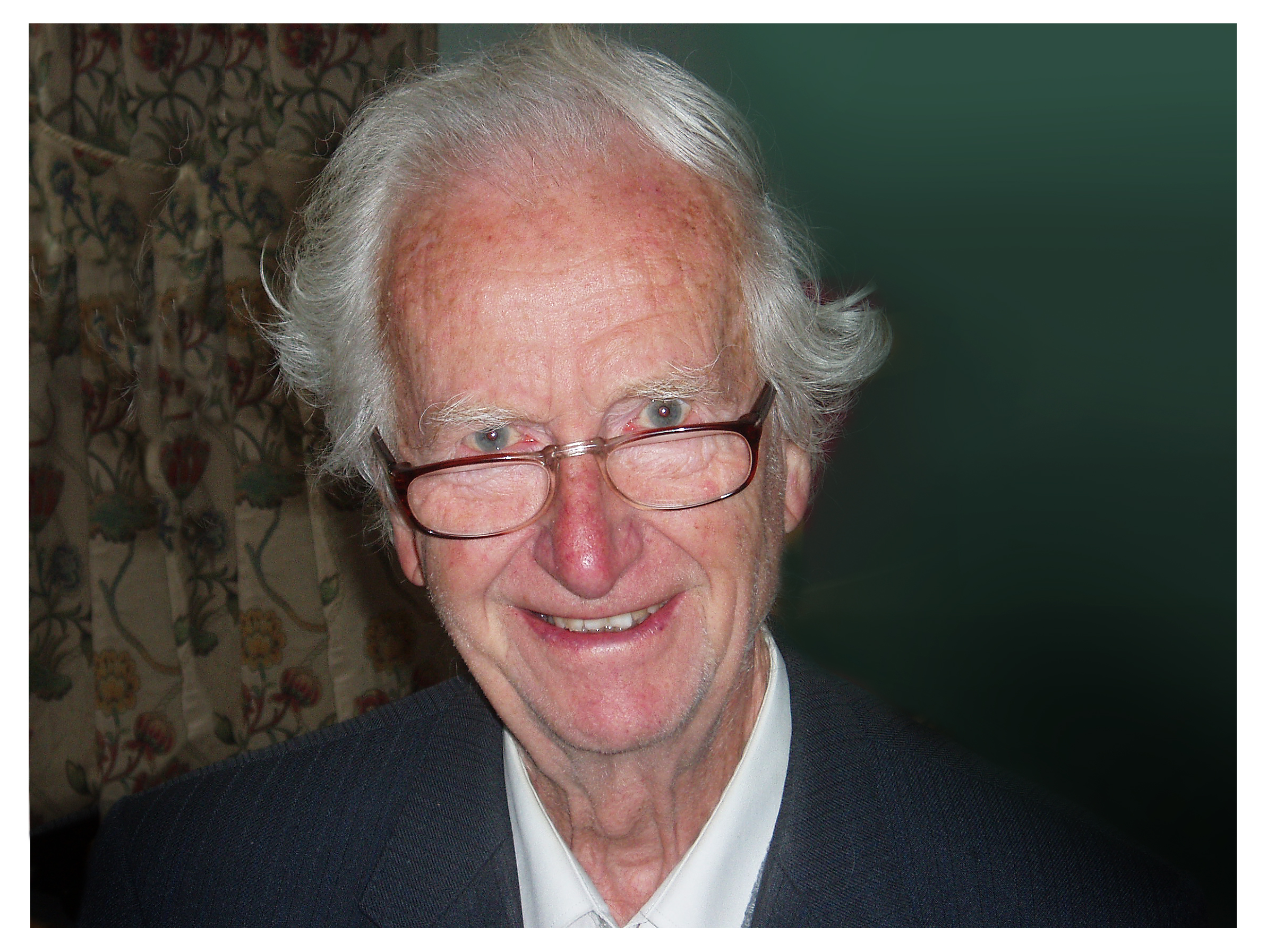
- Born: 28 July 1925
- Died: 2 December 2021 (aged 96)
- Education: University of Birmingham
- Known for: Nuclear physics
- Spouse: Elizabeth Honor Ward
- Children: 4
- Awards: OBE
- Scientific career
- Fields: Physics
- Workplaces: Finsen Institute; University of Ghana; University of Zambia; University of Swaziland; Open University
- Thesis: Directional-correlation in radioactivity (1949)
- Doctoral advisor: Mark Oliphant

Alan Howard Ward OBE (28 July 1925 – 2 December 2021) was a physicist who influenced science education in Africa and contributed to the understanding of the impacts of radioactive chemicals on human health.

== Education and early years ==
Alan was the youngest of four children of Edward Howard Ward, a post office worker, and Ursula Mabel Ward (née Vale). He was born in Woodford, London. He attended The Forest School in Waltham Forest until 1937. The family later moved to Chichester where he attended Chichester High School for Boys. Following a wartime degree at the University of Birmingham he worked under Mark Oliphant and completed a PhD in 1949. Alongside his studies, he served with the Air Training Corps from 20 September 1941 to 1 August 1943, where he was trained as a Flight Mechanic, and served with the Home Guard from 6 October 1943 to 31 December 1944. As part of the Birmingham University Senior Training Corps, he obtained the War Certificate "A" in 1944 and "B" in Electrical and Mechanical Engineering in 1945.

== Career ==
=== Finsen Institute, Denmark ===
After a period as an Assistant Lecturer at the University of Birmingham, Ward was sent by the Atomic Energy Research Establishment to study Thorotrast poisoning at the Finsen Institute in Denmark for two years. This work involved following up on patients who had been injected with Thorotrast as a radiocontrast agent in medical radiography, and started his interest in medical physics.

=== University of Ghana ===
Following an interview by the Inter-University Council for Higher Education Overseas (ICHEO), Ward was appointed as a lecturer in physics at the University of Ghana in 1951. For the period 1956-59 he served as Secretary of the Ghana National Committee for the International Geophysical Year. He was made a Senior Lecturer in 1958, and associate professor in 1963. He represented Ghana at the "Atoms for peace" conference in Geneva in 1959, and at Commonwealth Atomic Scientists and IAEA meetings.

==== Retention and toxicity of Strontium-90 ====
Starting in 1959, Ward founded a University Radioisotope and Health Physics Unit in Ghana with support from the Government National Research Council (later the Ghana Academy of Arts and Sciences) and the International Atomic Energy Agency (IAEA). With support from the Radiochemical Centre in Amersham (later Amersham plc) and the Atomic Energy Research Establishment at Harwell, he carried out long-term experiments on the effects of low doses of Strontium-90 on monkeys. Some of these results were presented at the UNESCO International Conference on Radioisotopes in Scientific Research in 1957. The unit also used radioisotopes to track dimethoate in the commercially important cacao trees.

==== Atomic bomb tests ====
In advance of the Gerboise Bleue French atomic bomb test in Algeria, Ward initiated radioactive fallout measurements across Ghana, and worked with the Ministry of Defence to build and staff dedicated laboratories in both Legon and Northern Ghana. His results on the level of radioactive fallout were contested by the French Government, who sent military officers to inspect the laboratories and verify the results. The results were presented to President Kwame Nkrumah's government, contributing to the decision to cut off diplomatic relations with France.

==== Proposed nuclear reactor at Kwabenya ====
President Nkrumah asked Robert Patrick Baffour, then Vice-Chancellor of the Kumasi College of Science and Technology (later the Kwame Nkrumah University of Science and Technology), to head up an initiative to establish a nuclear power program for Ghana. This later led to a proposal that Ghana import an IRT 2000 nuclear research reactor from the Soviet Union by 1964 and install it at Kwabenya. Ward, as head of the Radioisotopes and Health Physics Unit at Legon, estimated that Ghana needed approximately sixty "top-level Ghanaian scientists" and that it was not feasible to meet those needs. Nkrumah decided as a result that Ward was not fully supportive of his plans for nuclear research collaboration with the Soviet Union, so had him replaced by Alan Nunn May. This led to Ward leaving Ghana at the end of 1965.

=== UNZA ===
Ward was appointed as Professor of Physics at the University of Zambia (UNZA) in 1965, where he helped to found the department. He continued research on medical physics and remained there until 1975.

=== University of Swaziland ===
Ward joined the University of Botswana, Lesotho, and Swaziland (UBLS, later the University of Botswana and Swaziland and now the University of eSwatini) at the start of 1976. Reflecting the initial specialization of the university in agriculture, his research direction turned to the applications of physics to commercial farming. During his time in Swaziland he was awarded an OBE for services to science education in Africa.

=== Retirement ===
Ward retired to the United Kingdom in 1986. During his retirement he worked as a Physics Associate Lecturer with the Open University and taught with the University of the Third Age (U3A). As part of a wider interest in climate change, he adapted, built, and used electric vehicles, and became chair of the Battery Vehicle Society.

== Physics texts adapted for Africa ==
During their time in Ghana, Ward's wife E. H. Ward wrote a physics text covering the high school curriculum and adapted for an African audience. This used images and examples from Ghana to illustrate physical concepts, and appeared in a "Science for Tropical Secondary Schools" series. Alan Ward later collaborated with his wife to update the books to use S.I. units and update some of the contents. This updated version later appeared as a single volume.

== Personal life and death ==
Ward met Elizabeth Honor Shedden (12 April 1926 – 18 September 2016), also a physicist, at the University of Birmingham, and they married in 1950. They were both active in the Birmingham University Evangelical Christian Union, and remained active church members throughout their lives. Alan Ward died on 2 December 2021 at Groveland Care Home in Yeovil, Somerset. They had four children Kristina, Sheena, James, and Thomas, whose memoir has a more detailed account of Ward's life and work.
