= Henri Cohen (mathematician) =

French mathematician

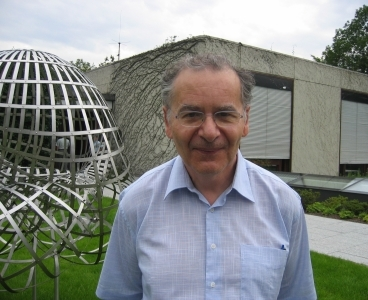
Henri Cohen in 2007 Photo courtesy MFO

Henri Cohen (born 8 June 1947) is a number theorist, and an emeritus professor at the University of Bordeaux. He is best known for leading the team that created the PARI/GP computer algebra system. He also introduced the Rankin–Cohen bracket, co-proposed the Cohen-Lenstra heuristics and has written several textbooks in computational and algebraic number theory.

== Selected publications ==
- Cohen, Henri (1996). A Course In Computational Algebraic Number Theory. Graduate Texts in Mathematics. Vol. 138. Springer-Verlag. ISBN 0-387-55640-0. 3rd, corrected printing; 2nd correct. print 1995; 1st printing 1993
- Cohen, Henri (2000). Advanced Topics in Computational Number Theory. Graduate Texts in Mathematics. Vol. 193. Springer-Verlag. ISBN 0-387-98727-4.
- Cohen, Henri (2006). Handbook of Elliptic and Hyperelliptic Curve Cryptography. Discrete Mathematics and Its Applications. Chapman & Hall/CRC. ISBN 978-1-58488-518-4.
- Cohen, Henri (2007). Number Theory – Volume I: Tools and Diophantine Equations. Graduate Texts in Mathematics. Vol. 239. Springer-Verlag. ISBN 978-0-387-49922-2.
- Cohen, Henri (2007). Number Theory – Volume II: Analytic and Modern Tools. Graduate Texts in Mathematics. Vol. 240. Springer-Verlag. ISBN 978-0-387-49893-5.
