= Russell Lyons =

American mathematician

Russell David Lyons (6 September 1957) is an American mathematician, specializing in probability theory on graphs, combinatorics, statistical mechanics, ergodic theory and harmonic analysis.

== Education and career ==
Lyons graduated with B.A. mathematics in 1979 from Case Western Reserve University, where he became a Putnam Fellow in 1977 and 1978. He received his Ph.D. in 1983 from the University of Michigan with the thesis A Characterization of Measures Whose Fourier-Stieltjes Transforms Vanish at Infinity, which was supervised by Hugh L. Montgomery and Allen Shields. Lyons was a postdoc for the academic years 1983–1985 at the University of Paris-Sud. He was an assistant professor at Stanford University from 1985 to 1990 and an associate professor at Indiana University from 1990 to 1994. At Georgia Tech he was a full professor from 2000 to 2003. At Indiana University he was a professor of mathematics from 1994 to 2014 and is since 2014 the James H. Rudy Professor of Mathematics; there he has also been an adjunct professor of statistics since 2006.

Lyons has held visiting positions in the United States, France, and Israel. In 2012 he was elected a Fellow of the American Mathematical Society. In 2014 he was an invited speaker of the International Congress of Mathematicians (ICM) in Seoul. In 2017 a conference was held in Tel Aviv in honor of his 60th birthday.

== Selected publications ==
- Lyons, Russell (1990). "Random Walks and Percolation on Trees". The Annals of Probability. 18 (3): 931–958. doi:10.1214/aop/1176990730. JSTOR 2244410.
- Lyons, Russell; Pemantle, Robin; Peres, Yuval (1995). "Conceptual Proofs of L Log L Criteria for Mean Behavior of Branching Processes". The Annals of Probability. 23 (3): 1125–1138. arXiv:math/0404083. doi:10.1214/aop/1176988176. JSTOR 2244865.
- Lyons, Russell (1997). "A Simple Path to Biggins' Martingale Convergence for Branching Random Walk". Classical and Modern Branching Processes. The IMA Volumes in Mathematics and its Applications. Vol. 84. pp. 217–221. arXiv:math/9803100. doi:10.1007/978-1-4612-1862-3_17. ISBN 978-1-4612-7315-8. S2CID 14006746.
- Schramm, Oded; Peres, Yuval; Lyons, Russell; Benjamini, Itai (2001). "Uniform spanning forests". The Annals of Probability. 29: 1–65. doi:10.1214/aop/1008956321.
- Aldous, David; Lyons, Russell (2007). "Processes on unimodular random networks" (PDF). Electronic Journal of Probability. 12: 1454–1508. doi:10.1214/EJP.v12-463. S2CID 2107134.
- Lyons, Russell; Peres, Yuval (2017-01-20). Probability on Trees and Networks. Cambridge University Press. ISBN 9781316785331.
