= Klaus Schmidt (mathematician) =

Austrian mathematician

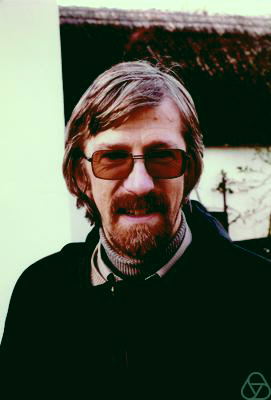
- Born: 25 September 1943 (age 83); Vienna
- Education: University of Vienna
- Awards: Ferran Sunyer i Balaguer Prize
- Scientific career
- Fields: Mathematics
- Workplaces: Bedford College; University of Warwick; University of Vienna
- Doctoral advisor: Edmund Hlawka
- Doctoral students: Giles Atkinson; Roger Butler; Zaqueu Coelho; Manfred Einsiedler; Ulrich Haboeck; Andrew Harding; Jane M. Hawkins; David Pask; Geoffrey Riley; Thomas Ward

Klaus D. Schmidt (born 25 September 1943) is an Austrian mathematician and retired professor at the Faculty of Mathematics, University of Vienna.

After studying mathematics at the University of Vienna he received his doctorate in 1968 under Edmund Hlawka. He held visiting professorships in Technical University of Vienna, University of Manchester in 1969, Bedford College (1969–1974) and the University of Warwick from 1974 to 1994 after which he came back to the University of Vienna. He retired in 2009. In 1975/76 K. R. Parthasarathy invited Klaus Schmidt to spend 7 months at the new Delhi Centre of Indian Statistical Institute (Parthasarathy was then working at the Indian Institute of Technology, Delhi).

In 1994 he was awarded the Ferran Sunyer i Balaguer Prize for the monograph Dynamical systems of algebraic origin. He is member of the Austrian Academy of Sciences.

He has researched among other things, ergodic theory and its connections with arithmetic, commutative algebra, harmonic analysis, operator algebras and probability theory.

== Publications ==
- Positive definite kernels, continuous tensor products, and central limit theorems in probability theory (with KR Parthasarathy). Lecture Notes in Mathematics, Vol 272, Springer Verlag 1972.
- Cocycles of ergodic transformation groups. Lecture Notes in Mathematics, Vol 1, MacMillan (India) 1977.
- Algebraic Ideas in Ergodic Theory. CBMS Lecture Notes, Vol 76, Amer. Math Soc. 1990.
- Dynamical systems of algebraic origin. Progress in Mathematics, Vol 128, Birkhauser Verlag 1995. Schmidt, Klaus (5 January 2012). 2012 reprint. ISBN 9783034802765.
