= Steven Roman =

American mathematician

Steven Roman is a mathematician, currently Emeritus Professor of Mathematics at California State University, Fullerton and Visiting Professor of Mathematics at University of California, Irvine. He is one of the main developers of umbral calculus. He has written about 40 books on mathematics and computer programming.

Professor Roman's books have been translated into Portuguese, French, Korean, Chinese, Russian, Polish, Bulgarian, Czech and Spanish.

== Computer programming books ==
- Concepts of Object-Oriented Programming with Visual Basic, Springer-Verlag.
- Access Database Design and Programming, Third Edition, O'Reilly and Associates.
- Understanding Personal Computer Hardware, Springer-Verlag.
- Writing Word Macros, O'Reilly and Associates.
- Developing Visual Basic Add-ins, O'Reilly and Associates.
- Writing Excel Macros with VBA, Second Edition, O'Reilly and Associates.
- Win32 API Programming with Visual Basic, O'Reilly and Associates.
- VB .NET Language in a Nutshell, O'Reilly and Associates.
- VB .NET Language Pocket Reference, O'Reilly and Associates.

== Mathematics books ==
- The Umbral Calculus, Pure and Applied Mathematics Vol. 111, Academic Press, 1984.
- An Introduction to Linear Algebra with Applications, Second edition, 1988, Saunders College Publishing.
- An Introduction to Discrete Mathematics, Second edition, 1989, Saunders College Publishing.
- College Algebra and Trigonometry, Saunders 1987.
- College Algebra, Saunders 1987.
- Precalculus, Saunders 1987.
- Coding and Information Theory, the Springer-Verlag, Graduate Texts in Mathematics Vol. 134, 1992.
- Advanced Linear Algebra, Springer-Verlag, Graduate Texts in Mathematics Vol. 135, 1992.
- Field Theory, Springer-Verlag, Graduate Texts in Mathematics Vol. 158, 1995.
- Introduction to Coding and Information Theory, Springer-Verlag, Undergraduate Texts in Mathematics, Springer-Verlag, 1996.
- Lattices and Ordered Sets, Springer-Verlag, 2008.
- Introduction to the Mathematics of Finance: Arbitrage and Option Pricing, Springer, 2012.
- Fundamentals of Group Theory, An Advanced Approach, Birkhauser, 2012.
- An Introduction to Catalan Numbers, Birkhauser, 2015.
- An Introduction to the language of Category Theory, Birkhauser, 2017.
