= Manfred Einsiedler =

Austrian mathematician

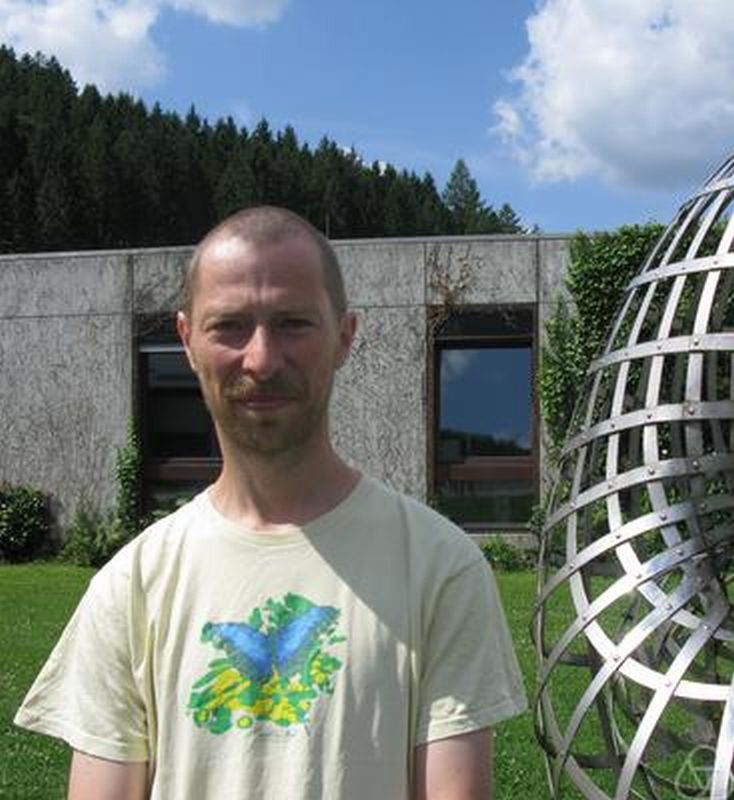
Einsiedler at Oberwolfach, 2010

Manfred Leopold Einsiedler is an Austrian mathematician who studies ergodic theory. He was born in Scheibbs, Austria in 1973.

== Education and career ==
Einsiedler studied mathematics at the University of Vienna, where he received his undergraduate degree in 1996 and his PhD in 1999 under Klaus Schmidt with thesis Problems in higher dimensional dynamics. He was a postdoc in the academic year 2000–2001 at the University of East Anglia in Norwich and in the academic year 2001–2002 at Penn State University. In 2001 he earned his habilitation at the University of Vienna and then became there a professor extraordinarius (on leave). In the academic year 2004–2005 he was a visiting professor at Princeton University (as a Clay Research Scholar). At Ohio State University he became in 2006 an associate Professor and in 2008 a full professor. Since 2009 he has been a professor ordinarius at ETH Zürich.

In 2004 he won the Research Prize of the Austrian Mathematical Society. In 2008 he was an invited speaker (Effective equidistribution and spectral gap) at the European Mathematical Congress in Amsterdam. In 2010 he was an invited speaker (Application of measure rigidity of diagonal actions) at the International Congress of Mathematicians in Hyderabad. In 2019 Einsiedler was also an invited speaker at the conference Dynamics, Equations and Applications in Kraków.

Einsiedler works on ergodic theory (especially, dynamical and equidistribution problems on homogeneous spaces) and its applications to number theory. He has collaborated with Grigory Margulis and Akshay Venkatesh. With Elon Lindenstrauss and Anatole Katok, Einsiedler proved that a conjecture of John Edensor Littlewood on diophantine approximation is "almost always" true. ( "Almost always" means in this context that the set of pairs of real numbers for which the conjecture fails has (in particular) Hausdorff dimension zero.)

== Selected works ==
- with Douglas Lind: "Algebraic Z^{d}-actions of entropy rank one". Trans. Amer. Math. Soc. 356 (5): 1799–1831. 2004. doi:10.1090/s0002-9947-04-03554-8. MR 2031042.
- "What is measure rigidity?" (PDF). Notices of the AMS. 56 (5): 600–601. May 2009.
- with Thomas Ward: Ergodic Theory: with a view towards Number Theory. London: Springer. 2010. ISBN 978-0-85729-020-5.
- with Thomas Ward: Functional Analysis, Spectral Theory, and Applications. London: Springer. 2017. ISBN 978-3-319-58540-6.
- with Menny Aka and Thomas Ward: A Journey Through The Realm of Numbers: From Quadratic Equations to Quadratic Reciprocity. London:Springer. 2020. ISBN 978-3-030-55232-9.
