= Matti Jutila =

Finnish mathematician

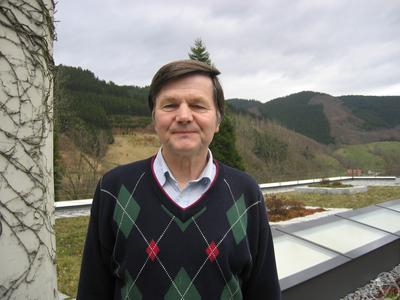
- Born: 16 March 1943; Vesilahti
- Died: 7 March 2026 (aged 82); Turku
- Scientific career
- Fields: Mathematics
- Institutions: University of Turku

Matti Ilmari Jutila (16 March 1943 – 7 March 2026) was a mathematician and a professor emeritus at the University of Turku. He researched in the field of analytic number theory.

== Education and career ==
Jutila was born on 16 March 1943 in Vesilahti, Finland. He completed a doctorate at the University of Turku in 1970, with a dissertation related to Linnik's constant supervised by Kustaa Inkeri.

Jutila's work has repeatedly succeeded in lowering the upper bound for Linnik's constant. He is the author of a monograph, Lectures on a method in the theory of exponential sums (1987). According to the Mathematics Genealogy Project, he advised five PhD students, all at the University of Turku. He was elected to membership in the Finnish Academy of Science and Letters in 1982.

== Personal life ==
Jutila died on 7 March 2026.
