= Hugh Lowell Montgomery =

American mathematician (born 1944)

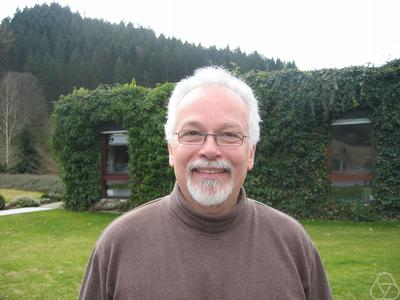
- Hugh Montgomery at Oberwolfach in 2008
- Born: August 26, 1944 (age 82); Muncie, Indiana, U.S.
- Education: University of Illinois Urbana-Champaign (BS 1966); University of Cambridge (PhD 1972)
- Known for: Analytic number theory
- Awards: Adams Prize (1972); Salem Prize (1974)
- Scientific career
- Fields: Mathematics
- Workplaces: University of Michigan
- Thesis: Topics in Multiplicative Number Theory (1972)
- Doctoral advisor: Harold Davenport
- Doctoral students: Brian Conrey; Russell Lyons; Sidney Graham

Hugh Lowell Montgomery (born 1944) is an American mathematician, working in the fields of analytic number theory and mathematical analysis. He is the namesake of Montgomery's pair correlation conjecture on the zeros of the Riemann zeta function, is known for his development of large sieve methods, and is the author of multiple books on number theory and analysis. He is a professor emeritus at the University of Michigan.

== Education and career ==
Montgomery was born on August 26, 1944, in Muncie, Indiana. He was an undergraduate at the University of Illinois Urbana-Champaign. On graduating in 1966, he became a Marshall scholar at the University of Cambridge in England. There, he became a Fellow of Trinity College, Cambridge in 1969, and completed his Ph.D. in 1972. His dissertation, Topics in Multiplicative Number Theory, was supervised by Harold Davenport.

He became an assistant professor of mathematics at the University of Michigan in 1972. He was quickly promoted, to associate professor in 1973 and full professor in 1975. At the University of Michigan, he advised 19 doctoral students, including Sidney Graham in 1977, Brian Conrey in 1980, and Russell Lyons in 1983. He retired as a professor emeritus in 2020.

== Recognition ==
Montgomery was a 1972 recipient of the Adams Prize, and the 1974 recipient of the Salem Prize.

In 1974, Montgomery was an invited speaker of the International Congress of Mathematicians (ICM) in Vancouver. In 2012, he became a fellow of the American Mathematical Society.

== Selected publications ==
=== Books ===
- Montgomery, Hugh L. (1971). Topics in Multiplicative Number Theory. Lecture Notes in Mathematics. Vol. 227. Berlin & New York: Springer-Verlag. MR 0337847. Zbl 0216.03501.
- Niven, Ivan; Zuckerman, Herbert S.; Montgomery, Hugh L. (1991). An Introduction to the Theory of Numbers (5th ed.). New York: John Wiley & Sons. ISBN 0-471-62546-9. MR 1083765. Zbl 0742.11001.
- Montgomery, Hugh L. (1994). Ten Lectures on the Interface Between Analytic Number Theory and Harmonic Analysis. CBMS Regional Conference Series in Mathematics. Vol. 84. Washington, DC and Providence, Rhode Island: Conference Board of the Mathematical Sciences and American Mathematical Society. doi:10.1090/cbms/084. ISBN 0-8218-0737-4. MR 1297543. Zbl 0814.11001.
- Montgomery, Hugh L.; Vaughan, Robert C. (2007). Multiplicative Number Theory. I. Classical Theory. Cambridge Studies in Advanced Mathematics. Vol. 97. Cambridge, UK: Cambridge University Press. ISBN 978-0-521-84903-6. MR 2378655. Zbl 1142.11001.
- Montgomery, Hugh L. (2014). Early Fourier Analysis. The Sally Series: Pure and Applied Undergraduate Texts. Vol. 22. American Mathematical Society. ISBN 9781470415600. MR 3243762. Zbl 1316.42001.

=== Research articles ===
- Montgomery, H. L.; Vaughan, R. C. (1973). "The large sieve". Mathematika. 20 (2): 119–134. doi:10.1112/S0025579300004708. MR 0374060.
- Montgomery, H. L. (1973). "The pair correlation of zeros of the zeta function". In Diamond, Harold G. (ed.). Analytic Number Theory: Proceedings of the Symposium in Pure Mathematics of the American Mathematical Society, held at St. Louis University, St. Louis, Mo., March 27–30, 1972. Proceedings of Symposia in Pure Mathematics. Vol. 24. Providence, Rhode Island: American Mathematical Society. pp. 181–193. MR 0337821.
- Levinson, Norman; Montgomery, Hugh L. (1974). "Zeros of the derivatives of the Riemann zeta-function". Acta Mathematica. 133: 49–65. doi:10.1007/BF02392141. MR 0417074.
- Beauzamy, Bernard; Bombieri, Enrico; Enflo, Per; Montgomery, Hugh L. (1990). "Products of polynomials in many variables". Journal of Number Theory. 36 (2): 219–245. doi:10.1016/0022-314X(90)90075-3. hdl:2027.42/28840. MR 1072467.
