= Transform theory =

In mathematics, transform theory is the study of transforms, which relate a function in one domain to another function in a second domain. The essence of transform theory is that by a suitable choice of basis for a vector space a problem may be simplified—or diagonalized as in spectral theory.

Main examples of transforms that are both well known and widely applicable include integral transforms such as the Fourier transform, the fractional Fourier Transform, the Laplace transform, and linear canonical transformations. These transformations are used in signal processing, optics, and quantum mechanics.

== Spectral theory ==
In spectral theory, the spectral theorem says that if A is an n×n self-adjoint matrix, there is an orthonormal basis of eigenvectors of A. This implies that A is diagonalizable.

Furthermore, each eigenvalue is real.

== Transforms ==
- Laplace transform
- Fourier transform
- Fractional Fourier Transform
- Linear canonical transformation
- Wavelet transform
- Hankel transform
- Joukowsky transform
- Mellin transform
- Z-transform
