= Positive operator =

In mathematics, a linear operator acting on inner product space

In mathematics (specifically linear algebra, operator theory, and functional analysis) as well as physics, a linear operator $A$ acting on an inner product space is called positive-semidefinite (or non-negative) if, for every $x \in \operatorname{Dom}(A)$, $\langle Ax, x\rangle \in \mathbb{R}$ and $\langle Ax, x\rangle \geq 0$, where $\operatorname{Dom}(A)$ is the domain of $A$. Positive-semidefinite operators are denoted as $A\ge 0$. The operator is said to be positive-definite, and written $A>0$, if $\langle Ax,x\rangle>0$ for all $x\in\mathop{\mathrm{Dom}}(A) \setminus \{0\}$.

Many authors define a positive operator $A$ to be a self-adjoint (or at least symmetric) non-negative operator. We show below that for a complex Hilbert space the self adjointness follows automatically from non-negativity. For a real Hilbert space non-negativity does not imply self adjointness.

In physics (specifically quantum mechanics), such operators represent quantum states, via the density matrix formalism.

== Cauchy–Schwarz inequality ==
Take the inner product $\langle \cdot, \cdot \rangle$ to be anti-linear on the first argument and linear on the second and suppose that $A$ is positive and symmetric, the latter meaning that $\langle Ax,y \rangle= \langle x,Ay \rangle$. Then the non negativity of

$$\begin{align}
\langle A(\lambda x+\mu y),\lambda x+\mu y \rangle
=|\lambda|^2 \langle Ax,x \rangle + \lambda^* \mu \langle Ax,y \rangle+ \lambda \mu^* \langle Ay,x \rangle + |\mu|^2 \langle Ay,y \rangle \\[1mm]
= |\lambda|^2 \langle Ax,x \rangle + \lambda^* \mu \langle Ax,y \rangle+ \lambda \mu^* (\langle Ax,y \rangle)^* + |\mu|^2 \langle Ay,y \rangle
\end{align}$$

for all complex $\lambda$ and $\mu$ shows that

$$\left|\langle Ax,y\rangle \right|^2 \leq \langle Ax,x\rangle \langle Ay,y\rangle.$$

It follows that $\mathop{\text{Im}}A \perp \mathop{\text{Ker}}A.$ If $A$ is defined everywhere, and $\langle Ax,x\rangle = 0,$ then $Ax = 0.$

== On a complex Hilbert space, if an operator is non-negative then it is symmetric ==
For $x,y \in \operatorname{Dom}A,$ the polarization identity

$$\begin{align}
\langle Ax,y\rangle = \frac{1}{4}({} & \langle A(x+y),x+y\rangle - \langle A(x-y),x-y\rangle \\[1mm]
& {} - i\langle A(x+iy),x+iy\rangle + i\langle A(x-iy),x-iy\rangle)
\end{align}$$

and the fact that $\langle Ax,x\rangle = \langle x,Ax\rangle,$ for positive operators, show that $\langle Ax,y\rangle = \langle x,Ay\rangle,$ so $A$ is symmetric.

In contrast with the complex case, a positive-semidefinite operator on a real Hilbert space $H_\mathbb{R}$ may not be symmetric. As a counterexample, define $A : \mathbb{R}^2 \to \mathbb{R}^2$ to be an operator of rotation by an acute angle $\varphi \in ( -\pi/2,\pi/2).$ Then $\langle Ax,x \rangle = \|Ax\|\|x\|\cos\varphi > 0,$ but $A^* = A^{-1} \neq A,$ so $A$ is not symmetric.

== If an operator is non-negative and defined on the whole complex Hilbert space, then it is self-adjoint and bounded ==
The symmetry of $A$ implies that $\operatorname{Dom}A \subseteq \operatorname{Dom}A^*$ and $A = A^*|_{\operatorname{Dom}(A)}.$ For $A$ to be self-adjoint, it is necessary that $\operatorname{Dom}A = \operatorname{Dom}A^*.$ In our case, the equality of domains holds because $H_\mathbb{C} = \operatorname{Dom}A \subseteq \operatorname{Dom}A^*,$ so $A$ is indeed self-adjoint. The fact that $A$ is bounded now follows from the Hellinger–Toeplitz theorem.

This property does not hold on $H_\mathbb{R}.$

== Partial order of self-adjoint operators ==
A natural partial ordering of self-adjoint operators arises from the definition of positive operators. Define $B \geq A$ if the following hold:

1. $A$ and $B$ are self-adjoint
2. $B - A \geq 0$

It can be seen that a similar result as the Monotone convergence theorem holds for monotone increasing, bounded, self-adjoint operators on Hilbert spaces.

== Application to physics: quantum states ==
The definition of a quantum system includes a complex separable Hilbert space $H_\mathbb{C}$ and a set $\cal S$ of positive trace-class operators $\rho$ on $H_\mathbb{C}$ for which $\mathop{\text{Trace}}\rho = 1.$ The set $\cal S$ is the set of states. Every $\rho \in {\cal S}$ is called a state or a density operator. For $\psi \in H_\mathbb{C},$ where $\|\psi\| = 1,$ the operator $P_\psi$ of projection onto the span of $\psi$ is called a pure state. (Since each pure state is identifiable with a unit vector $\psi \in H_\mathbb{C},$ some sources define pure states to be unit elements from $H_\mathbb{C}).$ States that are not pure are called mixed.
