= Kehe Zhu =

American Mathematician

Kehe Zhu (born July 8, 1961) is a Chinese American mathematician. He is a SUNY distinguished professor at the University at Albany and the Editor-in-Chief of The New York Journal of Mathematics. He is known for his research in complex analysis and functional analysis and was inducted in 2024 as a fellow of the American Mathematical Society. He served as the Chair of the Department of Mathematics and Statistics at SUNY-Albany from 2009 to 2015.

His specific research areas are Banach spaces of analytic functions (Bergman spaces, Hardy spaces, Fock spaces, etc) and operators on such spaces (Hankel operators, Toeplitz operators, composition operators, etc). He has published over 140 research papers in peer-reviewed academic journals. He has also published several mathematics books, including "Operator Theory in Function Spaces", "Theory of Bergman Spaces", "Spaces of Holomorphic Function Spaces on the Unit Ball", and "Analysis on Fock spaces".

He earned his PhD in Mathematics from SUNY-Buffalo in 1986. His PhD advisor was Lewis A. Coburn. He was a postdoc at the University of Washington (Fall 1986 to Summer 1988) and the University of Waterloo (Fall 1988). He joined the University at Albany (SUNY) in January 1989 as an assistant professor and became associate professor in 1992, full professor in 1995, and distinguished professor in 2025.
