= Graham Everest =

British mathematician

Graham Robert Everest (14 December 1957 in Southwick, West Sussex – 30 July 2010) was a British mathematician working on arithmetic dynamics and recursive equations in number theory.

== Life ==
Everest studied at Bedford College (now Royal Holloway College) of the University of London where he completed a Ph.D. in 1983 under the supervision of Colin J. Bushnell of King's College London (The distribution of normal integral generators in tame extensions of Q.) He joined the faculty of the University of East Anglia in 1983 as a lecturer and spent his academic career there.

He was ordained a priest in the Church of England in 2006. He died of prostate cancer on 30 July 2010, leaving behind his wife and three children.

== Awards ==
In 1983 he became a member of the London Mathematical Society. In 2012 he was awarded the Lester Randolph Ford Award jointly with Thomas Ward for their work in diophantine equations.

== Writing ==
- With Thomas Ward: Introduction to Number Theory, Springer-Verlag 2005.
- With Alf van der Poorten, Thomas Ward, and Igor Shparlinski: Recurrence sequences, American Mathematical Society 2003.
- With Thomas Ward: Heights of polynomials and entropy in algebraic dynamics, Springer Verlag 1999.
