= Carl Pearcy =

American mathematician (born 1935)

Carl Mark Pearcy, Jr.
- Born: August 25, 1935 (age 89)
- Occupation: Mathematician

Carl Mark Pearcy, Jr. (born August 25, 1935) is an American mathematician whose research has been concentrated on operator theory and operator algebras. He has coauthored several books, including "Introduction to Operator Theory I", Introduction to Analysis", and "Measure and integration", all published by Springer and coauthored by Arlen Brown (and Hari Bercovici in the case of Measure and integration). Pearcy had 31 Ph.D. students at Michigan and TAMU, several of whom are outstanding mathematicians. Pearcy's bibliography contains more than 150 papers, and his research has concerned the invariant subspace problem and the theory of dual algebras.

== Early life ==
Pearcy was born in Beaumont, Texas and raised in Galveston, Texas and educated at Texas A&M University, the University of Chicago, and Rice University.

== Career ==
His Ph. D. was taken from Rice University in 1960 under Arlen Brown. In 1963 Pearcy became a Hildebrandt Instructor at the University of Michigan. He was promoted to Professor in 1968 and remained there until 1990, when he retired and was named Professor of Mathematics at Texas A&M University. Pearcy retired from that position in 2012.
