= Jane M. Hawkins =

American mathematician

- Born: October 27, 1954 (age 71)
- Education: College of the Holy Cross (BS); University of Warwick (MSc, PhD)
- Spouse: Michael E. Taylor
- Awards: Marshall Scholarship (1976); Fellow of the American Mathematical Society
- Scientific career
- Fields: Mathematics; Dynamical systems; Ergodic theory
- Workplaces: University of North Carolina at Chapel Hill; Stony Brook University
- Thesis: Type III diffeomorphisms of manifolds (1980)
- Doctoral advisor: Klaus Schmidt
- Website: https://janehawkins.web.unc.edu/

Jane Margaret Hawkins (born October 27, 1954) is an American mathematician known for her research in dynamical systems and complex dynamics, including cellular automata and Julia sets. She is a professor of mathematics at the University of North Carolina at Chapel Hill. More recent research has included work on cellular automata models for the spread of HIV, Hepatitis C and Ebola.

== Early life and education ==
Hawkins was born on October 27, 1954. She was raised in Schenectady, New York. Her father was a chemical engineer, and her grandmother was an elementary school teacher.

Hawkins graduated from the College of the Holy Cross in Worcester, Massachusetts, with a Bachelor of Science in mathematics as valedictorian in 1976. She was the first female valedictorian at Holy Cross, graduating as a member of the college's first fully coeducational class. As an undergraduate, Hawkins gave a presentation titled "The Whitney Theory for Maps Between 2-Manifolds" at the 1976 annual meeting of Pi Mu Epsilon at the University of Toronto.

After graduation, Hawkins was awarded a Marshall Scholarship to pursue graduate studies in England, earning her M.Sc. in mathematics and Ph.D. in mathematics specializing in catastrophe theory from the University of Warwick in 1981. Her doctoral dissertation, completed under Klaus Schmidt, was titled, Type III Diffeomorphisms of Manifolds.

== Academic career ==
After receiving her doctorate, Hawkins was an assistant professor of mathematics at the State University of New York at Stony Brook from 1980 to 1986. She primarily taught Galois theory and probability theory there. In 1984, Hawkins was a visiting member at the Mathematical Sciences Research Institute. From 1986 to 1987, she was a visiting assistant professor at the California Institute of Technology. From 1999 to 2001, she was a faculty member in the National Security Agency-sponsored Summer Program for Women in Mathematics at George Washington University.

By 2001, Hawkins had moved to the University of North Carolina at Chapel Hill. UNC awarded her its Chancellor's Award for Instructional Technology in 1998. In 2004, was a visiting professor at Duke University, where her listed fields were ergodic theory and dynamical systems. Hawkins also served as a program director in the Division of Mathematical Sciences at the National Science Foundation. She later became a professor emerita of mathematics at UNC.

Hawkins has held several leadership roles in the American Mathematical Society (AMS), serving as a member-at-large of its Council from 1998 to 2000 and as a member of its Committee on Science Policy during the same period. As chair of the Committee on Science Policy in 2004, she testified before a subcommittee of the United States House Committee on Appropriations in support of fiscal year 2005 funding for the National Science Foundation. Hawkins became treasurer of the AMS on February 1, 2011. In 2012, Hawkins became an inaugural fellow of the American Mathematical Society. In March 2012, while serving as treasurer and a member of the AMS Board of Trustees, she testified before Congress in support of a $7.373 billion fiscal year 2013 appropriation for the National Science Foundation. Her tenure as AMS treasurer ended on January 31, 2021.

== Research ==
Hawkins's research has encompassed dynamical systems, ergodic theory, differentiable and complex dynamics, Markov shifts, and mathematical models involving HIV and Ebola, and she has published more than 50 research papers. Her research interests have also included cellular automata and Julia sets.

Hawkins published the graduate textbook Ergodic Dynamics: From Basic Theory to Applications with Springer in 2021. Her book The Mathematics of Cellular Automata, an introduction to cellular automata for advanced undergraduate students, was published by the American Mathematical Society in 2024. In 2026, Chapman & Hall published her textbook Mathematics for Artificial Intelligence, which presents mathematical foundations for artificial intelligence and machine learning.

== Personal life ==
Hawkins is married to mathematician Michael E. Taylor, whom she credits with encouraging her with continuing in research.
