= Thomas Ward (mathematician) =

British mathematician (born 1963)

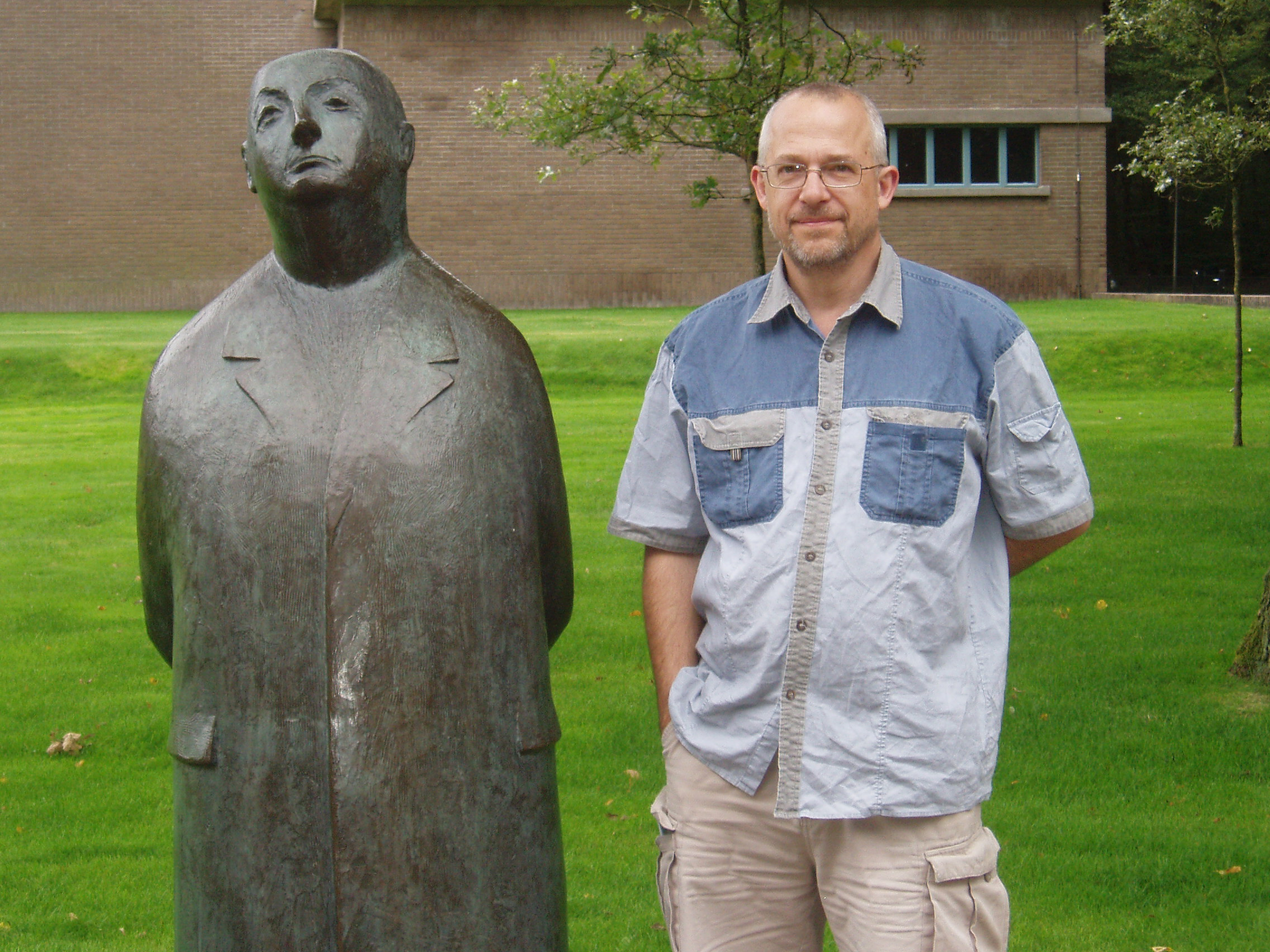
- Ward with statue in 2011
- Born: 3 October 1963 (age 63); Sherborne, Dorset, England
- Education: University of Warwick
- Spouse: Tania Louise Rose Barnett (m. 1990)
- Awards: Paul R. Halmos - Lester R. Ford Award
- Scientific career
- Fields: Mathematics
- Workplaces: University of Maryland; Ohio State University; University of East Anglia; Durham University; University of Leeds; Newcastle University
- Doctoral advisor: Klaus Schmidt

Thomas Boulton Ward (born 3 October 1963) is a British mathematician who works in ergodic theory and dynamical systems and its relations to number theory.

== Education ==
Ward was the fourth child of the physicist Alan Howard Ward and Elizabeth Honor Ward, a physics teacher. He attended Woodlands Primary School in Lusaka, Zambia, Waterford Kamhlaba (United World College) in Swaziland, and (briefly) the Thomas Hardye School in Dorchester, England. He studied mathematics at the University of Warwick from 1982, gaining an MSc with dissertation entitled "Automorphisms of solenoids and p-adic entropy" in 1986 and a PhD with dissertation entitled "Topological entropy and periodic points for Z^{d} actions on compact abelian groups with the Descending Chain Condition" in 1989, both under the supervision of Klaus Schmidt.

== Career ==
Ward worked at the University of Maryland in College Park, the Ohio State University, and the University of East Anglia. In 2012 he moved to Durham University as Pro-Vice-Chancellor for Education, in 2016 to the University of Leeds as Deputy Vice-Chancellor for Student Education, and to Newcastle University as Pro-Vice-Chancellor for Education from 2021 to 2023. He served in editorial roles for the London Mathematical Society from 2002 to 2012 and was a managing editor of Ergodic Theory and Dynamical Systems from 2012 to 2014. He served on the HEFCE advisory committees for Widening Participation and Student Opportunity (2013–15) and Teaching Excellence and Student Opportunity (2015–17).

== Works ==
In 2012 Ward, along with Graham Everest (posthumously) was awarded the Paul R. Halmos - Lester R. Ford Award for A Repulsion Motif in Diophantine Equations printed in the American Mathematical Monthly.

=== Selected papers ===
- Everest, G.; Miles, R.; Stevens, S.; Ward, T. (27 July 2007). "Orbit-counting in non-hyperbolic dynamical systems". Journal für die reine und angewandte Mathematik. 2007 (608): 155–182. arXiv:math/0511569. doi:10.1515/CRELLE.2007.056. ISSN 0075-4102. S2CID 2525037.
- Einsiedler, Manfred; Lind, Douglas; Miles, Richard; Ward, Thomas (2001). "Expansive subdynamics for algebraic \mathbb{Z}^d-actions". Ergodic Theory and Dynamical Systems. 21 (6): 1695–1729. arXiv:math/0104261. doi:10.1017/S014338570100181X. ISSN 1469-4417. S2CID 4037330.
- Ward, T.; Everest, G.; Chothi, V. (1 August 1997). "S-integer dynamical systems: periodic points". Journal für die reine und angewandte Mathematik. 1997 (489): 99–132. doi:10.1515/crll.1997.489.99. ISSN 0075-4102. S2CID 18684743.
- Ward, Tom; Schmidt, Klaus (1 December 1993). "Mixing automorphisms of compact groups and a theorem of Schlickewei". Inventiones Mathematicae. 111 (1): 69–76. Bibcode:1993InMat.111...69S. doi:10.1007/BF01231280. ISSN 1432-1297. S2CID 16067482.
- Zhang, Qing; Ward, Thomas (1 September 1992). "The Abramov-Rokhlin entropy addition formula for amenable group actions" (PDF). Monatshefte für Mathematik. 114 (3–4): 317–329. doi:10.1007/BF01299386. ISSN 1436-5081. S2CID 17722034.
- Ward, Tom; Schmidt, Klaus; Lind, Douglas (1 December 1990). "Mahler measure and entropy for commuting automorphisms of compact groups" (PDF). Inventiones Mathematicae. 101 (1): 593–629. Bibcode:1990InMat.101..593L. doi:10.1007/BF01231517. ISSN 1432-1297. S2CID 17077751.
- Ward, T.; Lind, D. A. (1988). "Automorphisms of solenoids and p-adic entropy*". Ergodic Theory and Dynamical Systems. 8 (3): 411–419. doi:10.1017/S0143385700004545. ISSN 0143-3857.

=== Edited proceedings ===
- Moree, Pieter; Pohl, Anke; Snoha, Lubomir; Ward, Thomas, eds. (2020). Dynamics : topology and numbers : Conference on dynamics : topology and numbers, July 2-6, 2018, Max Planck Institute for Mathematics, Bonn, Germany. Providence, Rhode Island: American Mathematical Society. ISBN 978-1-4704-5454-8. OCLC 1140387201.
- Kolyada, Sergiǐ; Möller, Martin; Moree, Pieter; Ward, Thomas, eds. (27 July 2016). Dynamics and numbers : a special program, June 1-July 31, 2014 : international conference, July 21-25, 2014, Max Planck Institute for Mathematics, Bonn, Germany. Providence, Rhode Island: American Mathematical Society. ISBN 978-1-4704-2020-8. OCLC 930786391.
- Kolyada, Sergiǐ; Manin, Yuri; Möller, Martin; Moree, Pieter; Ward, Thomas, eds. (2010). Dynamical numbers : interplay between dynamical systems and number theory : a special program, May 1-July 31, 2009; international conference, July 20-24, 2009, Max Planck Institute for Mathematics, Bonn, Germany. Providence, R.I.: American Mathematical Society. ISBN 978-0-8218-4958-3. OCLC 648146562.
- Koli︠a︡da, S. F.; Manin, I︠U︡. I.; Ward, Thomas, eds. (2005). Algebraic and topological dynamics : Algebraic and topological dynamics, May 1-July 31, 2004, Max-Planck-Institut für Mathematik, Bonn, Germany. Providence, R.I.: American Mathematical Society. ISBN 0-8218-3751-6. OCLC 60558944.

=== Books ===
- Einsiedler, Manfred Leopold; Ward, Thomas (2025). Unitary representations and unitary duals. Graduate texts in mathematics. Cham, Switzerland: Springer. ISBN 978-3-032-03898-2.
- Ward, Thomas (2023). People, Places, and Mathematics: A Memoir. Springer Biographies Series (1st ed.). Cham: Springer. ISBN 978-3-031-39073-9.
- Aka, Menny; Einsiedler, Manfred; Ward, Thomas (2020). Journey Through the Realm of Numbers: From quadratic equations to quadratic reciprocity. Springer Nature. ISBN 978-3-030-55232-9. OCLC 1160926263.
- Einsiedler, Manfred; Ward, Thomas (2017). Functional Analysis, Spectral Theory, and Applications. Springer Verlag. ISBN 978-3-319-58539-0.
- Einsiedler, Manfred; Ward, Thomas (2011). Ergodic Theory; with a view towards Number Theory. Springer Verlag. ISBN 978-0-85729-020-5.
- Everest, Graham; Ward, Thomas (2005). An Introduction to Number Theory. Springer Verlag. ISBN 978-1-85233-917-3.
- van der Poorten, Alfred; Ward, Thomas; Shparlinski, Igor; Everest, Graham (2003). Recurrence Sequences. American Mathematical Society. ISBN 978-1-4704-2315-5.
- Everest, Graham; Ward, Thomas (1999). Heights of Polynomials and Entropy in Algebraic Dynamics. Springer Verlag. ISBN 978-1-84996-854-6.- ebook 978-1-4471-3898-3

== Personal life ==
Ward met Tania Barnett, third child of Dr. Bernard Barnett and Ruth Barnett (née Michaelis) at the University of Warwick in 1986. They were married in London in 1990 and have two children, Adele Louise Barward-Symmons (1992) and Raphael Leslie Barnett-Ward (1995).
