= Commutant lifting theorem =

Operator theorem

In operator theory, the commutant lifting theorem, due to Sz.-Nagy and Foias, is a powerful theorem used to prove several interpolation results.

== Statement ==
The commutant lifting theorem states that if $T$ is a contraction on a Hilbert space $H$, $U$ is its minimal unitary dilation acting on some Hilbert space $K$ (which can be shown to exist by Sz.-Nagy's dilation theorem), and $R$ is an operator on $H$ commuting with $T$, then there is an operator $S$ on $K$ commuting with $U$ such that

$$R T^n = P_H S U^n \vert_H \; \forall n \geq 0,$$

and

$$\Vert S \Vert = \Vert R \Vert.$$

Here, $P_H$ is the projection from $K$ onto $H$. In other words, an operator from the commutant of T can be "lifted" to an operator in the commutant of the unitary dilation of T.

== Applications ==
The commutant lifting theorem can be used to prove the left Nevanlinna-Pick interpolation theorem, the Sarason interpolation theorem, and the two-sided Nudelman theorem, among others.

=== The Nevanlinna-Pick interpolation theorem ===
A classical application of the commutant lifting theorem is in solving the Nevanlinna-Pick interpolation problem. The points for which the interpolation problem has a solution can be characterized precisely in terms of the positive semi-definiteness of a certain matrix constructed from the points.

Theorem (Nevanlinna-Pick interpolation)—Let $z_1,\dots,z_n\in\mathbb D$ and $w_1,\dots,w_n\in\mathbb D$. The following are equivalent:

1. There exists a holomorphic function $\varphi:\mathbb D\to\mathbb D$ with $\varphi(z_j)=w_j$ for $j=1,\dots,n$.
2. The Pick matrix $\left(\frac{1-w_i\overline w_j}{1-z_i\overline z_j}\right)_{i,j=1}^n$ is positive semi-definite.

The main idea behind the proof is to consider the Hardy space $H^2(\mathbb D)$ of the disc $\mathbb D$ and use that this is a reproducing kernel Hilbert space with multipliers the space $H^\infty(\mathbb D)$ of bounded holomorphic functions on $\mathbb D$. The reproducing kernel of $H^2(\mathbb D)$ is the function

$$k(z,w)=\frac{1}{1-z\overline w}$$

commonly referred to as the Szegő kernel. The tricky part of the proof is showing that the condition of positive semi-definiteness implies the existence of said interpolating function. Following J. Agler and J. McCarthy the idea of the proof is as follows. Suppose that the Pick matrix is positive semi-definite. Consider, for $\varphi\in H^\infty(\mathbb D)$, the operator $M_\varphi$ on $H^2(\mathbb D)$ given by multiplication by $\varphi$, meaning that

$$M_\varphi f(z)=\varphi(z)f(z)$$

for $f\in H^2(\mathbb D)$. This is a bounded operator on $H^2(\mathbb D)$, and one can show that its adjoint $M_\varphi^*$ satisfies

$$M_\varphi^*k(\,\cdot\,,z)=\overline{\varphi(z)}k(\,\cdot\,,z)$$

An important special case of this is when $\varphi(z)=z$, in which case we write $M_z$ for its multiplication operator. Consider next the finite-dimensional subspace

$$S=\operatorname{span}\{k(\,\cdot\,,z_1),\dots,k(\,\cdot\,,z_n)\}$$

of $H^2(\mathbb D)$. Define an operator $T$ on $S$ by letting

$$Tk(\,\cdot\,,z_j)=\overline w_jk(\,\cdot\,,z_j)$$

The idea is now to extend the operator $T$ to the adjoint $M_\varphi^*$ of a multiplication operator on the entirety of $H^2(\mathbb D)$ for some $\varphi$, where $\varphi$ will then be the solution to the interpolation problem. This is where the commutant lifting theorem comes into play. In particular, one can verify that $S$ is an invariant subspace of $M_z^*$, that $T$ commutes with the restriction of $M_z^*$ to $S$, and that $M_z^*$ is co-isometric (meanining that its adjoint is isometric). Applying the commutant lifting theorem we can then find an operator $\tilde T$ on $H^2(\mathbb D)$ which agrees with $T$ on $S$, which has the same norm as $T$, and which commutes with $M_z^*$. Then in particular $\tilde T$ commutes with $M_p$ for any polynomial $p$. By setting $\varphi=\tilde T\mathbf 1$, where $\mathbf 1$ is the constant function equal to $1$, and using that the polynomials are dense in $H^2(\mathbb D)$, one can then show that $\tilde T^*=M_\varphi$, so that $\tilde T=M_\varphi^*$. This function must then interpolate the points, as

$$\overline{\varphi(z_j)}k(\,\cdot\,,z_j)=M_\varphi^*k(\,\cdot\,,z_j)=\tilde Tk(\,\cdot\,,z_j)=Tk(\,\cdot\,,z_j)=\overline w_j k(\,\cdot\,,z_j),$$

from which we get $\varphi(z_j)=w_j$. That $\varphi(\mathbb D)\subseteq\mathbb D$ is then a consequence of computing

$$\sup_{z\in\mathbb D}|\varphi(z)|=\lVert M_\varphi\rVert=\lVert\tilde T\rVert=\lVert T\rVert,$$

showing that $\lVert T\rVert\leq1$ by showing that $I-T^*T$ is positive (which is where the positive semi-definiteness of the Pick matrix comes in), and then finally appealing to the open mapping theorem. As such $\varphi$ is the desired interpolating function.
