= Kadison =

Kadison is a surname. Notable people with the surname include:

- Joshua Kadison (born 1963), American singer-songwriter, pianist, writer
- Luba Kadison (1906–2006), Lithuanian Jewish actress, active in Yiddish theatre
- Richard Kadison (1925–2018), American mathematician
- Rosemary Kadison (1932–2019), Sri Lankan Burgher author of historical romance novels
- Zak Kadison, American film producer

== See also ==
- Fuglede−Kadison determinant
- Kadison transitivity theorem
- Kadison–Kastler metric
- Kadison–Singer problem
- Kaplansky-Kadison conjecture
