= Graduate Studies in Mathematics =

Graduate-level textbooks in mathematics

Graduate Studies in Mathematics (GSM) is a series of graduate-level textbooks in mathematics published by the American Mathematical Society (AMS). The books in this series are published in hardcover and e-book formats.

== List of books ==
Volume	Title	Author(s)	Year	ISBN
1	The General Topology of Dynamical Systems	Ethan Akin	1993	978-0-8218-3800-6
2	Combinatorial Rigidity	Jack Graver, Brigitte Servatius, Herman Servatius	1993	978-0-8218-3801-3
3	An Introduction to Gröbner Bases	William W. Adams, Philippe Loustaunau	1994	978-0-8218-3804-4
4	The Integrals of Lebesgue, Denjoy, Perron, and Henstock	Russell A. Gordon	1994	978-0-8218-3805-1
5	Algebraic Curves and Riemann Surfaces	Rick Miranda	1995	978-0-8218-0268-7
6	Lectures on Quantum Groups	Jens Carsten Jantzen	1996	978-0-8218-0478-0
7	Algebraic Number Fields	Gerald J. Janusz	1996, 2nd ed.	978-0-8218-0429-2
8	Discovering Modern Set Theory. I: The Basics	Winfried Just, Martin Weese	1996	978-0-8218-0266-3
9	An Invitation to Arithmetic Geometry	Dino Lorenzini	1996	978-0-8218-0267-0
10	Representations of Finite and Compact Groups	Barry Simon	1996	978-0-8218-0453-7
11	Enveloping Algebras	Jacques Dixmier	1996	978-0-8218-0560-2
12	Lectures on Elliptic and Parabolic Equations in Hölder Spaces	N. V. Krylov	1996	978-0-8218-0569-5
13	The Ergodic Theory of Discrete Sample Paths	Paul C. Shields	1996	978-0-8218-0477-3
14	Analysis	Elliott H. Lieb, Michael Loss	2001, 2nd ed.	978-0-8218-2783-3
15	Fundamentals of the Theory of Operator Algebras. Volume I: Elementary Theory	Richard V. Kadison, John R. Ringrose	1997	978-0-8218-0819-1
16	Fundamentals of the Theory of Operator Algebras. Volume II: Advanced Theory	Richard V. Kadison, John R. Ringrose	1997	978-0-8218-0820-7
17	Topics in Classical Automorphic Forms	Henryk Iwaniec	1997	978-0-8218-0777-4
18	Discovering Modern Set Theory. II: Set-Theoretic Tools for Every Mathematician	Winfried Just, Martin Weese	1997	978-0-8218-0528-2
19	Partial Differential Equations	Lawrence C. Evans	2010, 2nd ed.	978-0-8218-4974-3
20	4-Manifolds and Kirby Calculus	Robert E. Gompf, András I. Stipsicz	1999	978-0-8218-0994-5
21	A Course in Operator Theory	John B. Conway	2000	978-0-8218-2065-0
22	Growth of Algebras and Gelfand-Kirillov Dimension	Günter R. Krause, Thomas H. Lenagan	2000, Revised ed.	978-0-8218-0859-7
23	Foliations I	Alberto Candel, Lawrence Conlon	2000	978-0-8218-0809-2
24	Number Theory: Algebraic Numbers and Functions	Helmut Koch	2000	978-0-8218-2054-4
25	Dirac Operators in Riemannian Geometry	Thomas Friedrich	2000	978-0-8218-2055-1
26	An Introduction to Symplectic Geometry	Rolf Berndt	2001	978-0-8218-2056-8
27	A Course in Differential Geometry	Thierry Aubin	2001	978-0-8218-2709-3
28	Notes on Seiberg-Witten Theory	Liviu I. Nicolaescu	2000	978-0-8218-2145-9
29	Fourier Analysis	Javier Duoandikoetxea	2001	978-0-8218-2172-5
30	Noncommutative Noetherian Rings	J. C. McConnell, J. C. Robson	1987	978-0-8218-2169-5
31	Option Pricing and Portfolio Optimization: Modern Methods of Financial Mathematics	Ralf Korn, Elke Korn	2001	978-0-8218-2123-7
32	A Modern Theory of Integration	Robert G. Bartle	2001	978-0-8218-0845-0
33	A Course in Metric Geometry	Dmitri Burago, Yuri Burago, Sergei Ivanov	2001	978-0-8218-2129-9
34	Differential Geometry, Lie Groups, and Symmetric Spaces	Sigurdur Helgason	2001	978-0-8218-2848-9
35	Lecture Notes in Algebraic Topology	James F. Davis, Paul Kirk	2001	978-0-8218-2160-2
36	Principles of Functional Analysis	Martin Schechter	2002, 2nd ed.	978-0-8218-2895-3
37	Theta Constants, Riemann Surfaces and the Modular Group: An Introduction with Applications to Uniformization Theorems, Partition Identities and Combinatorial Number Theory	Hershel M. Farkas, Irwin Kra	2001	978-0-8218-1392-8
38	Stochastic Analysis on Manifolds	Elton P. Hsu	2002	978-0-8218-0802-3
39	Classical Groups and Geometric Algebra	Larry C. Grove	2002	978-0-8218-2019-3
40	Function Theory of One Complex Variable	Robert E. Greene, Steven G. Krantz	2006, 3rd ed.	978-0-8218-3962-1
41	Introduction to the Theory of Differential Inclusions	Georgi V. Smirnov	2002	978-0-8218-2977-6
42	Introduction to Quantum Groups and Crystal Bases	Jin Hong, Seok-Jin Kang	2002	978-0-8218-2874-8
43	Introduction to the Theory of Random Processes	N. V. Krylov	2002	978-0-8218-2985-1
44	Pick Interpolation and Hilbert Function Spaces	Jim Agler, John E. McCarthy	2002	978-0-8218-2898-4
45	An Introduction to Measure and Integration	Inder K. Rana	2002, 2nd ed.	978-0-8218-2974-5
46	Several Complex Variables with Connections to Algebraic Geometry and Lie Groups	Joseph L. Taylor	2002	978-0-8218-3178-6
47	Classical and Quantum Computation	A. Yu. Kitaev, A. H. Shen, M. N. Vyalyi	2002	978-0-8218-2161-9
48	Introduction to the h-Principle	Y. Eliashberg, N. Mishachev	2002	978-0-8218-3227-1
49	Secondary Cohomology Operations	John R. Harper	2002	978-0-8218-3270-7
50	An Invitation to Operator Theory	Y. A. Abramovich, C. D. Aliprantis	2002	978-0-8218-2146-6
51	Problems in Operator Theory	Y. A. Abramovich, C. D. Aliprantis	2002	978-0-8218-2147-3
52	Global Analysis: Differential Forms in Analysis, Geometry and Physics	Ilka Agricola, Thomas Friedrich	2002	978-0-8218-2951-6
53	Spectral Methods of Automorphic Forms	Henryk Iwaniec	2002, 2nd ed.	978-0-8218-3160-1
54	A Course in Convexity	Alexander Barvinok	2002	978-0-8218-2968-4
55	A Scrapbook of Complex Curve Theory	C. Herbert Clemens	2003, 2nd ed.	978-0-8218-3307-0
56	A Course in Algebra	E. B. Vinberg	2003	978-0-8218-3318-6
57	Concise Numerical Mathematics	Robert Plato	2003	978-0-8218-2953-0
58	Topics in Optimal Transportation	Cédric Villani	2003	978-0-8218-3312-4
59	Representation Theory of Finite Groups: Algebra and Arithmetic	Steven H. Weintraub	2003	978-0-8218-3222-6
60	Foliations II	Alberto Candel, Lawrence Conlon	2003	978-0-8218-0881-8
61	Cartan for Beginners: Differential Geometry via Moving Frames and Exterior Differential Systems	Thomas A. Ivey, J. M. Landsberg	2003	978-0-8218-3375-9
62	A Companion to Analysis: A Second First and First Second Course in Analysis	T. W. Körner	2004	978-0-8218-3447-3
63	Resolution of Singularities	Steven Dale Cutkosky	2004	978-0-8218-3555-5
64	Lectures on the Orbit Method	A. A. Kirillov	2004	978-0-8218-3530-2
65	Global Calculus	S. Ramanan	2005	978-0-8218-3702-3
66	Functional Analysis: An Introduction	Yuli Eidelman, Vitali Milman, Antonis Tsolomitis	2004	978-0-8218-3646-0
67	Introduction to Quadratic Forms over Fields	T.Y. Lam	2005	978-0-8218-1095-8
68	A Geometric Approach to Free Boundary Problems	Luis Caffarelli, Sandro Salsa	2005	978-0-8218-3784-9
69	Curves and Surfaces	Sebastián Montiel, Antonio Ros	2009, 2nd ed.	978-0-8218-4763-3
70	Probability Theory in Finance: A Mathematical Guide to the Black-Scholes Formula	Seán Dineen	2013, 2nd ed.	978-0-8218-9490-3
71	Modern Geometric Structures and Fields	S. P. Novikov, I. A. Taimanov	2006	978-0-8218-3929-4
72	Introduction to the Mathematics of Finance	Ruth J. Williams	2006	978-0-8218-3903-4
73	Graduate Algebra: Commutative View	Louis Halle Rowen	2006	978-0-8218-0570-1
74	Elements of Combinatorial and Differential Topology	V. V. Prasolov	2006	978-0-8218-3809-9
75	Applied Asymptotic Analysis	Peter D. Miller	2006	978-0-8218-4078-8
76	Measure Theory and Integration	Michael E. Taylor	2006	978-0-8218-4180-8
77	Hamilton's Ricci Flow	Bennett Chow, Peng Lu, Lei Ni	2006	978-0-8218-4231-7
78	Linear Algebra in Action	Harry Dym	2013, 2nd ed.	978-1-4704-0908-1
79	Modular Forms, a Computational Approach	William A. Stein	2007	978-0-8218-3960-7
80	Probability	Davar Khoshnevisan	2007	978-0-8218-4215-7
81	Elements of Homology Theory	V. V. Prasolov	2007	978-0-8218-3812-9
82	Pseudo-differential Operators and the Nash-Moser Theorem	Serge Alinhac, Patrick Gérard	2007	978-0-8218-3454-1
83	Functions of Several Complex Variables and Their Singularities	Wolfgang Ebeling	2007	978-0-8218-3319-3
84	Cones and Duality	Charalambos D. Aliprantis, Rabee Tourky	2007	978-0-8218-4146-4
85	Recurrence and Topology	John M. Alongi, Gail S. Nelson	2007	978-0-8218-4234-8
86	Lectures on Analytic Differential Equations	Yulij Ilyashenko, Sergei Yakovenko	2008	978-0-8218-3667-5
87	Twenty-Four Hours of Local Cohomology	Srikanth B. Iyengar, Graham J. Leuschke, Anton Leykin, Claudia Miller, Ezra Miller, Anurag K. Singh, Uli Walther	2007	978-0-8218-4126-6
88	C∗-Algebras and Finite-Dimensional Approximations	Nathanial P. Brown, Narutaka Ozawa	2008	978-0-8218-4381-9
89	A Course on the Web Graph	Anthony Bonato	2008	978-0-8218-4467-0
90	Basic Quadratic Forms	Larry J. Gerstein	2008	978-0-8218-4465-6
91	Graduate Algebra: Noncommutative View	Louis Halle Rowen	2008	978-0-8218-4153-2
92	Finite Group Theory	I. Martin Isaacs	2008	978-0-8218-4344-4
93	Topics in Differential Geometry	Peter W. Michor	2008	978-0-8218-2003-2
94	Representations of Semisimple Lie Algebras in the BGG Category O	James E. Humphreys	2008	978-0-8218-4678-0
95	Quantum Mechanics for Mathematicians	Leon A. Takhtajan	2008	978-0-8218-4630-8
96	Lectures on Elliptic and Parabolic Equations in Sobolev Spaces	N. V. Krylov	2008	978-0-8218-4684-1
97	Complex Made Simple	David C. Ullrich	2008	978-0-8218-4479-3
98	Discrete Differential Geometry: Integrable Structure	Alexander I. Bobenko, Yuri B. Suris	2008	978-0-8218-4700-8
99	Mathematical Methods in Quantum Mechanics: With Applications to Schrödinger Operators	Gerald Teschl	2009	978-0-8218-4660-5
100	Algebra: A Graduate Course	I. Martin Isaacs	1994	978-0-8218-4799-2
101	A Course in Approximation Theory	Ward Cheney, Will Light	2000	978-0-8218-4798-5
102	Introduction to Fourier Analysis and Wavelets	Mark A. Pinsky	2002	978-0-8218-4797-8
103	Configurations of Points and Lines	Branko Grünbaum	2009	978-0-8218-4308-6
104	Algebra: Chapter 0	Paolo Aluffi	2009	978-0-8218-4781-7
105	A First Course in Sobolev Spaces	Giovanni Leoni	2009	978-0-8218-4768-8
106	Embeddings in Manifolds	Robert J. Daverman, Gerard A. Venema	2009	978-0-8218-3697-2
107	Manifolds and Differential Geometry	Jeffrey M. Lee	2009	978-0-8218-4815-9
108	Mapping Degree Theory	Enrique Outerelo, Jesús M. Ruiz	2009	978-0-8218-4915-6
109	Training Manual on Transport and Fluids	John C. Neu	2010	978-0-8218-4083-2
110	Differential Algebraic Topology: From Stratifolds to Exotic Spheres	Matthias Kreck	2010	978-0-8218-4898-2
111	Ricci Flow and the Sphere Theorem	Simon Brendle	2010	978-0-8218-4938-5
112	Optimal Control of Partial Differential Equations: Theory, Methods and Applications	Fredi Troltzsch	2010	978-0-8218-4904-0
113	Continuous Time Markov Processes: An Introduction	Thomas M. Liggett	2010	978-0-8218-4949-1
114	Advanced Modern Algebra	Joseph J. Rotman	2010, 2nd ed.	978-0-8218-4741-1
115	An Introductory Course on Mathematical Game Theory	Julio González-Díaz, Ignacio García-Jurado, M. Gloria Fiestras-Janeiro	2010	978-0-8218-5151-7
116	Linear Functional Analysis	Joan Cerdà	2010	978-0-8218-5115-9
117	An Epsilon of Room, I: Real Analysis: pages from year three of a mathematical blog	Terence Tao	2010	978-0-8218-5278-1
118	Dynamical Systems and Population Persistence	Hal L. Smith, Horst R. Thieme	2011	978-0-8218-4945-3
119	Mathematical Statistics: Asymptotic Minimax Theory	Alexander Korostelev, Olga Korosteleva	2011	978-0-8218-5283-5
120	A Basic Course in Partial Differential Equations	Qing Han	2011	978-0-8218-5255-2
121	A Course in Minimal Surfaces	Tobias Holck Colding, William P. Minicozzi II	2011	978-0-8218-5323-8
122	Algebraic Groups and Differential Galois Theory	Teresa Crespo, Zbigniew Hajto	2011	978-0-8218-5318-4
123	Lectures on Linear Partial Differential Equations	Gregory Eskin	2011	978-0-8218-5284-2
124	Toric Varieties	David A. Cox, John B. Little, Henry K. Schenck	2011	978-0-8218-4819-7
125	Riemann Surfaces by Way of Complex Analytic Geometry	Dror Varolin	2011	978-0-8218-5369-6
126	An Introduction to Measure Theory	Terence Tao	2011	978-0-8218-6919-2
127	Modern Classical Homotopy Theory	Jeffrey Strom	2011	978-0-8218-5286-6
128	Tensors: Geometry and Applications	J. M. Landsberg	2012	978-0-8218-6907-9
129	Classical Methods in Ordinary Differential Equations: With Applications to Boundary Value Problems	Stuart P. Hastings, J. Bryce McLeod	2012	978-0-8218-4694-0
130	Gröbner Bases in Commutative Algebra	Viviana Ene, Jürgen Herzog	2011	978-0-8218-7287-1
131	Lie Superalgebras and Enveloping Algebras	Ian M. Musson	2012	978-0-8218-6867-6
132	Topics in Random Matrix Theory	Terence Tao	2012	978-0-8218-7430-1
133	Hyperbolic Partial Differential Equations and Geometric Optics	Jeffrey Rauch	2012	978-0-8218-7291-8
134	Analytic Number Theory: Exploring the Anatomy of Integers	Jean-Marie De Koninck, Florian Luca	2012	978-0-8218-7577-3
135	Linear and Quasi-linear Evolution Equations in Hilbert Spaces	Pascal Cherrier, Albert Milani	2012	978-0-8218-7576-6
136	Regularity of Free Boundaries in Obstacle-Type Problems	Arshak Petrosyan, Henrik Shahgholian, Nina Uraltseva	2012	978-0-8218-8794-3
137	Ordinary Differential Equations: Qualitative Theory	Luis Barreira, Clàudia Valls	2012	978-0-8218-8749-3
138	Semiclassical Analysis	Maciej Zworski	2012	978-0-8218-8320-4
139	Knowing the Odds: An Introduction to Probability	John B. Walsh	2012	978-0-8218-8532-1
140	Ordinary Differential Equations and Dynamical Systems	Gerald Teschl	2012	978-0-8218-8328-0
141	A Course in Abstract Analysis	John B. Conway	2012	978-0-8218-9083-7
142	Higher Order Fourier Analysis	Terence Tao	2012	978-0-8218-8986-2
143	Lecture Notes on Functional Analysis: With Applications to Linear Partial Differential Equations	Alberto Bressan	2013	978-0-8218-8771-4
144	Dualities and Representations of Lie Superalgebras	Shun-Jen Cheng, Weiqiang Wang	2012	978-0-8218-9118-6
145	The K-book: An Introduction to Algebraic K-theory	Charles A. Weibel	2013	978-0-8218-9132-2
146	Combinatorial Game Theory	Aaron N. Siegel	2013	978-0-8218-5190-6
147	Matrix Theory	Xingzhi Zhan	2013	978-0-8218-9491-0
148	Introduction to Smooth Ergodic Theory	Luis Barreira, Yakov Pesin	2013	978-0-8218-9853-6
149	Mathematics of Probability	Daniel W. Stroock	2013	978-1-4704-0907-4
150	The Joys of Haar Measure	Joe Diestel, Angela Spalsbury	2013	978-1-4704-0935-7
151	Introduction to 3-Manifolds	Jennifer Schultens	2014	978-1-4704-1020-9
152	An Introduction to Extremal Kähler Metrics	Gábor Székelyhidi	2014	978-1-4704-1047-6
153	Hilbert's Fifth Problem and Related Topics	Terence Tao	2014	978-1-4704-1564-8
154	A Course in Complex Analysis and Riemann Surfaces	Wilhelm Schlag	2014	978-0-8218-9847-5
155	An Introduction to the Representation Theory of Groups	Emmanuel Kowalski	2014	978-1-4704-0966-1
156	Functional Analysis: An Elementary Introduction	Markus Haase	2014	978-0-8218-9171-1
157	Mathematical Methods in Quantum Mechanics: With Applications to Schrödinger Operators	Gerald Teschl	2014, 2nd ed.	978-1-4704-1704-8
158	Dynamical Systems and Linear Algebra	Fritz Colonius, Wolfgang Kliemann	2014	978-0-8218-8319-8
159	The Role of Nonassociative Algebra in Projective Geometry	John R. Faulkner	2014	978-1-4704-1849-6
160	A Course in Analytic Number Theory	Marius Overholt	2014	978-1-4704-1706-2
161	Introduction to Tropical Geometry	Diane Maclagan, Bernd Sturmfels	2015	978-0-8218-5198-2
162	A Course on Large Deviations with an Introduction to Gibbs Measures	Firas Rassoul-Agha, Timo Seppäläinen	2015	978-0-8218-7578-0
163	Introduction to Analytic and Probabilistic Number Theory	Gérald Tenenbaum	2015, 3rd ed.	978-0-8218-9854-3
164	Expansion in Finite Simple Groups of Lie Type	Terence Tao	2015	978-1-4704-2196-0
165	Advanced Modern Algebra, Part 1	Joseph J. Rotman	2015, 3rd ed.	978-1-4704-1554-9
166	Problems in Real and Functional Analysis	Alberto Torchinsky	2015	978-1-4704-2057-4
167	Singular Perturbation in the Physical Sciences	John C. Neu	2015	978-1-4704-2555-5
168	Random Operators: Disorder Effects on Quantum Spectra and Dynamics	Michael Aizenman, Simone Warzel	2015	978-1-4704-1913-4
169	Partial Differential Equations: An Accessible Route through Theory and Applications	András Vasy	2015	978-1-4704-1881-6
170	Colored Operads	Donald Yau	2016	978-1-4704-2723-8
171	Nonlinear Elliptic Equations of the Second Order	Qing Han	2016	978-1-4704-2607-1
172	Combinatorics and Random Matrix Theory	Jinho Baik, Percy Deift, Toufic Suidan	2016	978-0-8218-4841-8
173	Differentiable Dynamical Systems: An Introduction to Structural Stability and Hyperbolicity	Lan Wen	2016	978-1-4704-2799-3
174	Quiver Representations and Quiver Varieties	Alexander Kirillov Jr.	2016	978-1-4704-2307-0
175	Cartan for Beginners: Differential Geometry via Moving Frames and Exterior Differential Systems	Thomas A. Ivey, Joseph M. Landsberg	2016, 2nd ed.	978-1-4704-0986-9
176	Ordered Groups and Topology	Adam Clay, Dale Rolfsen	2016	978-1-4704-3106-8
177	Differential Galois Theory through Riemann–Hilbert Correspondence: An Elementary Introduction	Jacques Sauloy	2016	978-1-4704-3095-5
178	From Frenet to Cartan: The Method of Moving Frames	Jeanne N. Clelland	2017	978-1-4704-2952-2
179	Modular Forms: A Classical Approach	Henri Cohen, Fredrik Strömberg	2017	978-0-8218-4947-7
180	Advanced Modern Algebra, Part 2	Joseph J. Rotman	2017, 3rd ed.	978-1-4704-2311-7
181	A First Course in Sobolev Spaces	Giovanni Leoni	2017, 2nd ed.	978-1-4704-2921-8
182	Nonlinear PDEs: A Dynamical Systems Approach	Guido Schneider, Hannes Uecker	2017	978-1-4704-3613-1
183	Separable Algebras	Timothy J. Ford	2017	978-1-4704-3770-1
184	An Introduction to Quiver Representations	Harm Derksen, Jerzy Weyman	2017	978-1-4704-2556-2
185	Braid Foliations in Low-Dimensional Topology	Douglas J. LaFountain, William W. Menasco	2017	978-1-4704-3660-5
186	Rational Points on Varieties	Bjorn Poonen	2017	978-1-4704-3773-2
187	Introduction to Global Analysis: Minimal Surfaces in Riemannian Manifolds	John Douglas Moore	2017	978-1-4704-2950-8
188	Introduction to Algebraic Geometry	Steven Dale Cutkosky	2018	978-1-4704-3518-9
189	Characters of Solvable Groups	I. Martin Isaacs	2018	978-1-4704-3485-4
190	Lectures on Finite Fields	Xiang-dong Hou	2018	978-1-4704-4289-7
191	Functional Analysis	Theo Bühler, Dietmar A. Salamon	2018	978-1-4704-4190-6
192	Lectures on Navier-Stokes Equations	Tai-Peng Tsai	2018	978-1-4704-3096-2
193	A Tour of Representation Theory	Martin Lorenz	2018	978-1-4704-3680-3
194	Algebraic Statistics	Seth Sullivant	2018	978-1-4704-3517-2
195	Combinatorial Reciprocity Theorems: An Invitation to Enumerative Geometric Combinatorics	Matthias Beck, Raman Sanyal	2018	978-1-4704-2200-4
196	Convection-Diffusion Problems: An Introduction to Their Analysis and Numerical Solution	Martin Stynes, David Stynes	2018	978-1-4704-4868-4
197	A Course on Partial Differential Equations	Walter Craig	2018	978-1-4704-4292-7
198	Dynamics in One Non-Archimedean Variable	Robert L Benedetto	2019	978-1-4704-4688-8
199	Applied Stochastic Analysis	Weinan E, Tiejun Li, Eric Vanden-Eijnden	2019	978-1-4704-4933-9
200	Mathematical Theory of Scattering Resonances	Semyon Dyatlov, Maciej Zworski	2019	978-1-4704-4366-5
201	Geometric Relativity	Dan A Lee	2019	978-1-4704-5081-6
202	Introduction to Complex Analysis	Michael E Taylor	2019	978-1-4704-5286-5
203	The Distribution of Prime Numbers	Dimitris Koukoulopoulos	2019	978-1-4704-4754-0
204	Hochschild Cohomology for Algebras	Sarah J. Witherspoon	2019	978-1-4704-4931-5
205	Invitation to Partial Differential Equations	Maxim Braverman, Robert McOwen, Peter Topalov, Mikhail Shubin	2020	978-0-8218-3640-8
206	Extrinsic Geometric Flows	Ben Andrews, Bennett Chow, Christine Guenther, Mat Langford	2020	978-1-4704-5596-5
207	Organized Collapse: An Introduction to Discrete Morse Theory	Dmitry N. Kozlov	2020	978-1-4704-5701-3
208	Geometry and Topology of Manifolds: Surfaces and Beyond	Vicente Muñoz, Ángel González-Prieto, Juan Ángel Rojo	2020	978-1-4704-6132-4
209	Hyperbolic Knot Theory	Jessica Purcell	2020	978-1-4704-5499-9
210	Combinatorics: The Art of Counting	Bruce E. Sagan	2020	978-1-4704-6032-7
211	Invitation to Nonlinear Algebra	Mateusz Michałek, Bernd Sturmfels	2021	978-1-4704-6551-3
212	Differential Equations: A Dynamical Systems Approach to Theory and Practice	Marcelo Viana, José M. Espinar	2021	978-1-4704-5114-1
213	Hamilton–Jacobi Equations: Theory and Applications	Hung Vinh Tran	2021	978-1-4704-6511-7
214	Portfolio Theory and Arbitrage: A Course in Mathematical Finance	Ioannis Karatzas, Constantinos Kardaras	2021	978-1-4704-6014-3
215	Shock Waves	Tai-Ping Liu	2021	978-1-4704-6567-4
216	A Concise Introduction to Algebraic Varieties	Brian Osserman	2021	978-1-4704-6013-6
217	Lectures on Poisson Geometry	Marius Crainic, Rui Loja Fernandes, Ioan Mărcuț	2021	978-1-4704-6430-1
218	Lectures on Differential Topology	Riccardo Benedetti	2021	978-1-4704-6674-9
219	Essentials of Tropical Combinatorics	Michael Joswig	2021	978-1-4704-6653-4
220	Ultrafilters Throughout Mathematics	Isaac Goldbring	2022	978-1-4704-6900-9
221	One-Dimensional Ergodic Schrödinger Operators: I. General Theory	David Damanik, Jake Fillman	2022	978-1-4704-5606-1
222	Algebraic Geometry: Notes on a Course	Michael Artin	2022	978-1-4704-7111-8
223	Groups and Topological Dynamics	Volodymyr Nekrashevych	2022	978-1-4704-6380-9
224	Discrete Analogues in Harmonic Analysis: Bourgain, Stein, and Beyond	Ben Krause	2022	978-1-4704-6857-6
225	The Mathematical Analysis of the Incompressible Euler and Navier-Stokes Equations: An Introduction	Jacob Bedrossian, Vlad Vicol	2022	978-1-4704-7049-4
226	A First Course in Spectral Theory	Milivoje Lukić	2022	978-1-4704-6656-5
227	Geometric Structures on Manifolds	William M. Goldman	2022	978-1-4704-7103-3
228	Topological and Ergodic Theory of Symbolic Dynamics	Henk Bruin	2022	978-1-4704-6984-9
229	A First Course in Fractional Sobolev Spaces	Giovanni Leoni	2023	978-1-4704-6898-9
230	Inverse Problems for Fractional Partial Differential Equations	Barbara Kaltenbacher, William Rundell	2023	978-1-4704-7277-1
231	Introduction to Smooth Ergodic Theory	Luis Barreira, Yakov Pesin	2023, 2nd ed.	978-1-4704-7065-4
232	Linear Algebra in Action	Harry Dym	2023, 3rd ed.	978-1-4704-7419-5
233	Commutative Algebra	Andrea Ferretti	2023	978-1-4704-7434-8
234	Homological Methods in Commutative Algebra	Andrea Ferretti	2023	978-1-4704-7128-6
235	Ricci Solitons in Low Dimensions	Bennett Chow	2023	978-1-4704-7428-7
236	Alexandrov Geometry: Foundations	Stephanie Alexander, Vitali Kapovitch, Anton Petrunin	2024	978-1-4704-7302-0
237	Topics in Spectral Geometry	Michael Levitin, Dan Mangoubi, Iosif Polterovich	2023	978-1-4704-7548-2
238	An Introductory Course on Mathematical Game Theory	Julio González-Díaz, Ignacio García-Jurado, M. Gloria Fiestras-Janeiro	2023, 2nd ed.	978-0-8218-5151-7
239	Introduction to the h-Principle	K. Cieliebak, Y. Eliashberg, N. Mishachev	2024, 2nd ed.	978-1-4704-7617-5
240	Analysis of Monge–Ampère Equations	Nam Q. Le	2024	978-1-4704-7420-1
241	Real Algebraic Geometry and Optimization	Thorsten Theobald	2024	978-1-4704-7431-7
242	Translation Surfaces	Jayadev S. Athreya, Howard Masur	2024	978-1-4704-7655-7
243	Quantum Computation and Quantum Information: A Mathematical Perspective	J. M. Landsberg	2024	978-1-4704-7557-4
244	Introduction to Complex Manifolds	John M. Lee	2024	978-1-4704-7695-3
245	Lectures on Differential Geometry	Bennett Chow, Yutze Chow	2024	978-1-4704-7767-7
246	Bifurcation Theory	Ale Jan Homburg, Jürgen Knobloch	2024	978-1-4704-7794-3
247	An Invitation to Fractal Geometry: Fractal Dimensions, Self-Similarity, and Fractal Curves	Michel L. Lapidus, Goran Radunović	2024	978-1-4704-7623-6
248	Introduction to Lie Algebras: Finite and Infinite Dimension	J. I. Hall	2024	978-1-4704-7499-7
249	One-Dimensional Ergodic Schrödinger Operators: II. Specific Classes	David Damanik, Jake Fillman	2024	978-1-4704-6503-2
250	The Practice of Algebraic Curves: A Second Course in Algebraic Geometry	David Eisenbud, Joe Harris	2024	978-1-4704-7637-3
251	Inequalities in Matrix Algebras	Eric Carlen	2025	978-1-4704-7923-7

== See also ==
- Graduate Texts in Mathematics
