= John McCarthy (mathematician) =

Mathematician

John Edward McCarthy (born 20 January 1964) is a mathematician. He is currently the Spencer T. Olin Professor of Arts and Sciences, and former chair of the Department of Mathematics and Statistics at Washington University in St. Louis. He works in operator theory and several complex variables, and applications of mathematics to other areas.

== Early life, education, and career ==
McCarthy is a native of Ireland, and received a B.A. from Trinity College Dublin, in 1983. He completed a Ph.D. from the University of California, Berkeley in 1989. His Ph.D. Advisor was Donald Sarason.

He originally intended to return to Ireland after his doctorate, but the Irish universities were subject to a hiring freeze at the time. Instead, after postdoctoral research at Indiana University Bloomington, he joined Washington University in St. Louis in 1991, and became a US citizen in 1996. He has been a full professor since 1999, and Spencer T. Olin Professor of Arts and Sciences at Washington University in St. Louis since 2011. He chaired the Department of Mathematics and Statistics from 2016 to 2021.

== Recognition ==
McCarthy was one of two 2016 recipients of the Gilbert de Beauregard Robinson Award of the Canadian Mathematical Society He was elected as a Fellow of the American Mathematical Society in 2018.

== Books ==
McCarthy's books include:

- Holomorphic Spaces (edited with Sheldon Axler and Donald Sarason), Cambridge University Press, 1998.
- Pick Interpolation and Hilbert function spaces (with Jim Agler), Graduate Studies in Mathematics, vol. 44, American Mathematical Society, 2002.
- Transition to Higher Mathematics: Structure and Proof (with Bob A. Dumas), 1st ed., McGraw Hill, 2006; 2nd. ed., Washington University Open Scholarship, 2015.
- Operator Analysis: Hilbert space methods in complex analysis (with Jim Agler and Nicholas Young), Cambridge Tracts in Mathematics, vol. 219, Cambridge University Press, 2020.
