= Brown measure =

Probability measure on a complex plane

In mathematics, the Brown measure, named after Lawrence G. Brown, is a probability measure generalizing the normalized eigenvalue-counting measure (also called normalized (random) trace). It is in the same way closely related to the spectral counting measure and is a useful tool for analyzing spectrum and eigenvalues of infinite dimensional linear operators in a von Neumann algebra.

== Conventions and notation ==
This article uses the following conventions and notations.

- $\mathcal{P}( S )$ is the power set of the set $S$.
- $E( T )$ is the eigenspace of the linear operator $T$,
- $| T | := \sqrt{T^{\dagger} \cdot T}$ is the operator modulus of the linear operator $T$.
- $\Delta$ is the Laplacian in a distributional sense and $\Delta_{z} f( z ) := \Delta f$ for a function $f \in C^{2}( \mathbb{C} \to \mathbb{C} )$ where $\mathbb{C} \cong \mathbb{R}^{2}$ is treated as real vector space meaning in conventional notation $\Delta_{z} f( z ) = \frac{\mathrm{d}^{2}f( z )}{\mathrm{d}\Re( z )^{2}} + \frac{\mathrm{d}^{2}f( z )}{\mathrm{d}\Im( z )^{2}}$.
- $\delta_{z}$ for a $z \in \mathbb{C}$ is the Dirac delta function.
- $\det$ is the determinant function.
- $\ln = \log_{e}$ is the natural logarithm.

== Motivation ==
The spectrum and eigenspace of a complex linear operator provides a lot of information about the linear operator itself such as invertibility, asymptotic behavior under potentiation e.g. via the spectral radius, and much more. In larger or even infinite dimensions finding these properties can be quite a challenging task. The same is true in a weaker form for their distributions so knowing them can be useful.

Given a $n \in \mathbb{N}$-dimensional quadratic complex matrix $M \in \mathbb{C}^{n \times n}$ its eigenvalues $\lambda_{1},\, \ldots,\, \lambda_{n}$ are given by the zeros of its characteristic polynomial $\chi_{M}{:}\, \mathbb{C} \to \mathbb{C},\, \lambda \mapsto \det( \lambda \cdot I - M )$ (including multiplicities) allowing us to formulate a probability measure space $( \mathbb{C},\, \mathcal{A},\, \mathbb{P} )$ with a $\sigma$-algebra $\mathcal{A} \subseteq \mathcal{P}( \mathbb{C} )$ and probability measure
$$\mathbb{P}{:}\, \mathcal{A} \to [ 0,\, 1 ],\, A \mapsto \frac{1}{n}\cdot \sum_{k = 1}^{n} \delta_{\lambda_{k}}( A )$$
(the normalized eigenvalue-counting measure) assigning each set $A \in \mathcal{A}$ a weighted sum of the number of $M$s eigenvalues in $A$. This means that if for the eigenspace, which in finite dimension is equal to the spectrum, $E( M )$ and a set $A \in \mathcal{A}$ is $\mathbb{P}( A ) = 1$ if and only if $\mathbb{P}( A ) = 1$.

As useful as this construction is in finite dimensions, it fails in infinite dimensions for one the determinant of an infinite-dimensional linear operator might be undefined, the spectrum and eigenspace must not be equal, can each have infinite cardinality and thus can't define the normalized eigenvalue-counting measure. But to still characterize the eigenvalues and the spectrum a generalization is needed. One of these generalization called Brown measure.

Another approach is needed. Define
$$u{:}\, \mathbb{C} \setminus E( M ) \to \mathbb{C},\, z \mapsto \frac{1}{n} \cdot \ln( | \det( z \cdot I - M ) | ).$$
Now by using the relation $\det( \lambda \cdot I - M ) = \prod_{k = 1}^{n} ( z - \lambda_{k} )$, $\forall ( x_{k} )_{k \in \mathbb{N}_{\leq n}} \in \mathbb{R}_{\geq 0}^{n}{:}\, \ln( \prod_{k = 1}^{n} x_{k} ) = \sum_{k = 1}^{n} \ln( x_{k} )$ and $\forall ( x_{k} )_{k \in \mathbb{N}_{\leq n}} \in \mathbb{C}^{n}{:}\, | \prod_{k = 1}^{n} x_{k} | = \prod_{k = 1}^{n} | x_{k} |$ the function $u$ reduces to
$$\begin{align}
\forall z \in \mathbb{C} \setminus E( M ) \to \mathbb{C}{:}\, u( z ) &= \frac{1}{n} \cdot \ln( | \det( z \cdot I - M ) | )\\
&= \frac{1}{n} \cdot \ln\left( \prod\limits_{k = 1}^{n} | z - \lambda_{k} | \right)\\
&= \frac{1}{n} \cdot \sum\limits_{k = 1}^{n} \ln( | z - \lambda_{k} | ).
\end{align}$$
Using the same probability measure space as before $( \mathbb{C},\, \mathcal{A},\, \mathbb{P} )$ we can rewrite this as
$$\begin{align}
\forall z \in \mathbb{C} \setminus E( M ) \to \mathbb{C}{:}\, u( z ) &= \frac{1}{n} \cdot \sum\limits_{k = 1}^{n} \ln( | z - \lambda_{k} | )\\
&= \int_{\mathbb{C}} \frac{1}{n} \cdot \sum\limits_{k = 1}^{n} \ln( | z - w | ) \cdot \delta_{\lambda_{k}}( w )\, \mathrm{d}w\\
&= \int_{\mathbb{C}} \ln( | z - w | ) \cdot \frac{1}{n} \cdot \sum\limits_{k = 1}^{n} \delta_{\lambda_{k}}( w )\, \mathrm{d}w\\
&= \int_{\mathbb{C}} \ln( | z - w | )\, \mathrm{d}\mathbb{P}( w ).
\end{align}$$
Now by applying the complex Laplacian $\Delta$ in the distributional sense gives
$$\Delta u = \int_{\mathbb{C}} \Delta_{z} \ln( | z - w | )\, \mathrm{d}\mathbb{P}( w ) = \int_{\mathbb{C}} 2 \cdot \pi \cdot \delta_{w}\, \mathrm{d}\mathbb{P}( w ) = 2 \cdot \pi \cdot \mathbb{P}.$$
Brown worked on von Neumann algebras and found that given a tracial von Neumann algebra $A$ with a faithful, normal, normalized tracial state $\tau{:}\, A \to \mathbb{C}$ the linear operator satisfying this relation is $\mathbb{C} \setminus E( M ) \to \mathbb{C},\, \tau( \ln( | z \cdot I - T | ) )$ with $| T | := \sqrt{T^{\dagger} \cdot T}$ as the operator modulus. And for a matrix $T$ in this von Neumann algebra became $\mu_{T} = \frac{1}{2 \cdot \pi} \cdot \Delta \tau( \ln( | z \cdot I - T | ) )$ to be known as the Brown measure.

== Definition ==
Let $\mathcal{M}$ be a finite von Neumann algebra equipped with a faithful, normalized normal trace $\tau{:}\, \mathcal{M} \to \mathbb{C}$ so is the Brown measure of a $T \in \mathcal{M}$ defined by
$$\mu_{T} := \frac{1}{2 \cdot \pi} \cdot \Delta_{z} \tau( \ln( | z \cdot I - T | ) ).$$
$u_{T}{:}\, \mathbb{C} \to \mathbb{C},\, z \mapsto \tau( \ln( | z \cdot I - T | ) )$ is subharmonic function that can also be written in terms of the Fuglede−Kadison determinant $\Delta_{\text{FK}}$ as $u_{T}( z ) := \ln( \Delta_{\text{FK}}( T - z \cdot I ) )$.

Another notation for the Brown measure is $B_{T}$.

== Properties ==
$\mu_{T}$ forms a probability measure of the $W^{\ast}$-probability space $( \mathcal{M},\, \tau )$. Formally: If $T \in \mathcal{M}$ and $\mathcal{A} \subseteq \mathcal{P}( \mathbb{C} )$ is a $\sigma$-algebra on $\mathbb{C}$ so is $( \mathbb{C},\, \mathcal{A},\, \mu_{T} )$ a probability measure space.

We have $\forall n \in \mathbb{N}_{0}{:}\, \int_{\mathbb{C}} z^{n}\, \mathrm{d}\mu_{T}( z ) = \tau( T^{n} )$ and if $T \in \mathcal{M}$ is inverteble $\forall k \in \mathbb{Z}{:}\, \int_{\mathbb{C}} z^{k}\, \mathrm{d}\mu_{T}( z ) = \tau( T^{k} )$.

For all $T \in \mathcal{M}$ is $\mu_{T}$.compactly supportet. The spectrum of a $T \in \mathcal{M}$ contains $\mu_{T}$s support ($\operatorname{supp}( \mu_{T} ) \subseteq \operatorname{spec}( T )$).

For all $A,\, B \in \mathcal{M}$ is $\mu_{A \cdot B} = \mu_{B \cdot A}$.

=== Relations to other measures ===
Let $n \in \mathbb{N}$, If $T \in \mathbb{C}^{n \times n}$ so is Browns measure the normalized eigenvalue-counting measure $\mu_{T}{:}\, A \mapsto \frac{1}{n} \cdot \sum_{k = 1}^{n} \delta_{\lambda_{k}}( A )$ where $\lambda_{1},\, \ldots,\, \lambda_{n}$ are the eigenvalues of $T$ including multiplicity according to its characteristic polynomial.

If $T \in \mathcal{M}$ is self-adjoint so is Brown measure the spectral measure.

If $T = c_{t} \in \mathcal{M}$ is a circular Brownian motion so is Brown measure the uniform probability measure on the disk of radius $\sqrt{t}$.

Given a Haar unitary element $U$ the Brown measure is the normalized Haar measure $\text{haar}$ on the complex unit circle $\mu_{U} = \frac{1}{2 \cdot \pi} \cdot \text{haar}_{\{ z \in \mathbb{C} \mid | z | = 1 \}}$.

Besides the trivial relation to the Lebesgue measure $\lambda_{2}$ given by its definition the is also the relations: If $\mathfrak{c}$ is a circular element and $T \in \mathcal{M}$ is $\ast$-free of $\mathfrak{c}$ so is

- the Brown measure $\mu_{T + \mathfrak{c}}$ absolutely continues with respect to the Lebesgue measure $\mu_{T + \mathfrak{c}} \ll \lambda_{2}$ on $\mathbb{C}$,
- the densityof $\mu_{T + \mathfrak{c}}$ with respect to $\lambda_{2}$ is strictly positive and analytic on $\operatorname{supp}( \mu_{T} )$.

== See also ==
- Direct integral – Generalization of the concept of a direct sum in mathematics
