= Bent Fuglede =

Danish mathematician (1925–2023)

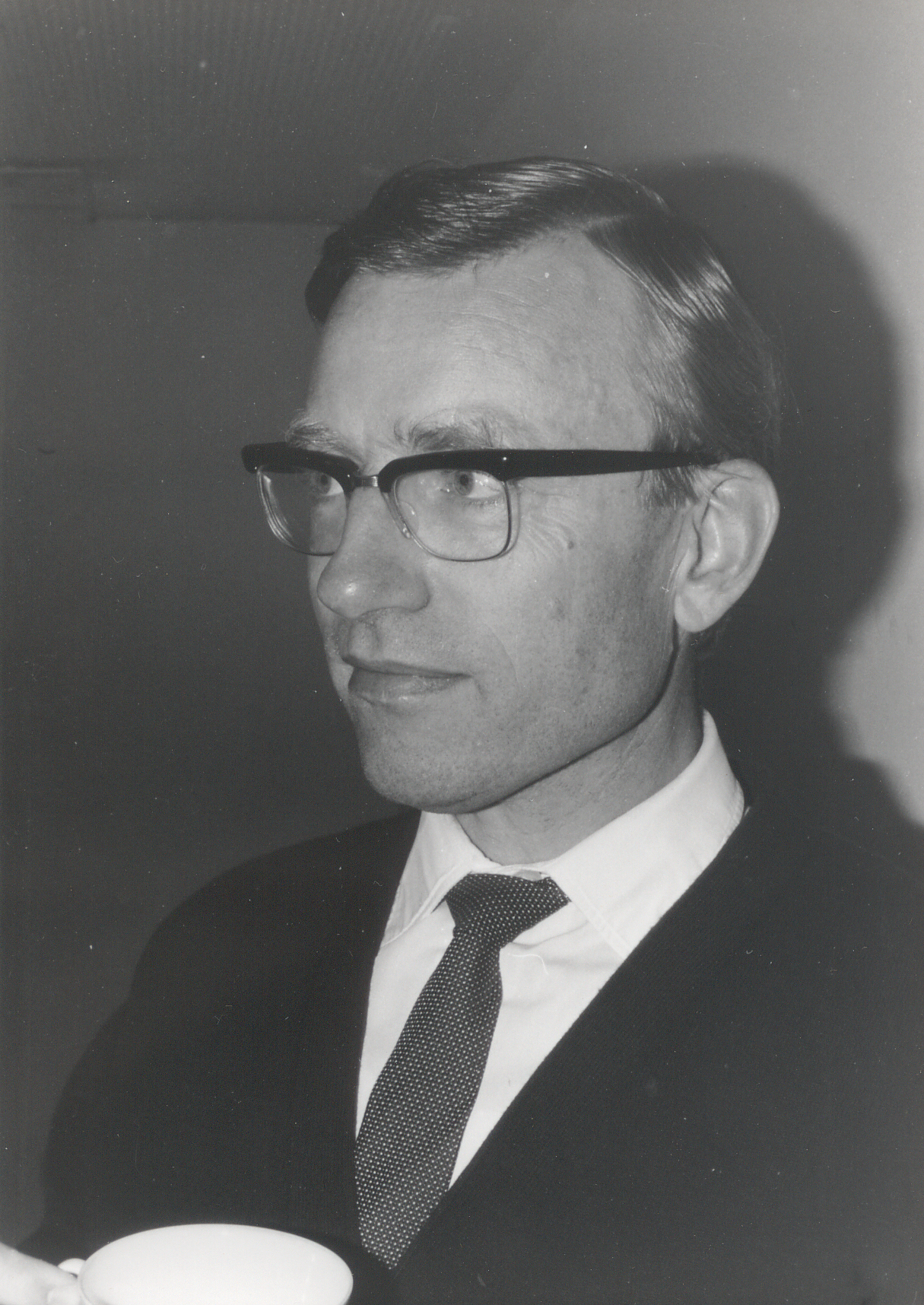
- Fuglede in 1972
- Born: 8 October 1925; Copenhagen, Denmark
- Died: 7 December 2023 (aged 98); Copenhagen, Denmark
- Known for: Fuglede's conjecture Fuglede's theorem Fuglede−Kadison determinant
- Scientific career
- Fields: Mathematics

Bent Fuglede (8 October 1925 – 7 December 2023) was a Danish mathematician.

== Early life and career ==
Fuglede was known for his contributions to mathematical analysis, in particular functional analysis, where he proved Fuglede's theorem and stated Fuglede's conjecture.

Fuglede graduated from Skt. Jørgens Gymnasium 1943 and received his mag. scient. og cand. mag. in 1948 at the University of Copenhagen after which he studied in USA until 1951. In 1952 he was employed as scientific assistant at Den Polytekniske Læreanstalt and in 1954 as amanuensis at Matematisk Institut University of Copenhagen, in 1958 associate professor, and in 1959 head of department. Fuglede also spent one year in Lund (Sweden) as Nordic docent. Fuglede received his dr.phil. (Ph.D.) in 1960 from the University of Copenhagen; his doctoral advisor was Børge Jessen, after which he became professor of math at Danmarks tekniske Højskole. In 1965 he became professor of math at the University of Copenhagen, where he stayed until his retirement in 1992.

Fuglede was a member of the Royal Danish Academy of Sciences and Letters, the Finnish Academy of Science and Letters. and the Bayerische Akademie der Wissenschaften. In 2012 he became a fellow of the American Mathematical Society.

== Personal life and death ==
Fuglede was married to Ólafía Einarsdóttir, an Icelandic archeologist and historian. They had one child together, Einar.

Bent Fuglede died in Copenhagen on 7 December 2023, at the age of 98.

== Books ==
- Fuglede, Bent (1972). Finely Harmonic Functions. Lecture Notes in Mathematics. Vol. 289. Springer-Verlag. ISBN 978-3-540-06005-5.
- Fuglede, Bent; Eells, James (2001). Harmonic maps between Riemannian polyhedra. Cambridge tracts in mathematics. Vol. 142. Cambridge University Press. ISBN 0-521-77311-3.
