= Dirichlet algebra =

Algebraic structure

In mathematics, a Dirichlet algebra is a particular type of algebra associated to a compact Hausdorff space X. It is a closed subalgebra of C(X), the uniform algebra of bounded continuous functions on X, whose real parts are dense in the algebra of bounded continuous real functions on X. The concept was introduced by Andrew Gleason (1957).

== Example ==
Let $\mathcal{R}(X)$ be the set of all rational functions that are continuous on $X$; in other words functions that have no poles in $X$. Then

$$\mathcal{S} = \mathcal{R}(X) + \overline{\mathcal{R}(X)}$$

is a *-subalgebra of $C(X)$, and of $C\left(\partial X\right)$. If $\mathcal{S}$ is dense in $C\left(\partial X\right)$, we say $\mathcal{R}(X)$ is a Dirichlet algebra.

It can be shown that if an operator $T$ has $X$ as a spectral set, and $\mathcal{R}(X)$ is a Dirichlet algebra, then $T$ has a normal boundary dilation. This generalises Sz.-Nagy's dilation theorem, which can be seen as a consequence of this by letting

$$X=\mathbb{D}.$$
