= Fuglede's conjecture =

Mathematical problem

Fuglede's conjecture is a problem in mathematics proposed by Bent Fuglede in 1974, and resolved in the negative for most dimensions by Terence Tao in 2004. It states that every domain of $\mathbb{R}^{d}$ (i.e. subset of $\mathbb{R}^{d}$ with positive finite Lebesgue measure) is a spectral set if and only if it tiles $\mathbb{R}^{d}$ by translation.

== Spectral sets and translational tiles ==
Spectral sets in $\mathbb{R}^d$

A set $\Omega$ $\subset$ $\mathbb{R}^{d}$ with positive finite Lebesgue measure is said to be a spectral set if there exists a $\Lambda$ $\subset$ $\mathbb{R}^d$ such that $\left \{ e^{2\pi i\left \langle \lambda, \cdot \right \rangle} \right \}_{\lambda\in\Lambda}$ is an orthogonal basis of $L^2(\Omega)$. The set $\Lambda$ is then said to be a spectrum of $\Omega$ and $(\Omega, \Lambda)$ is called a spectral pair.

Translational tiles of $\mathbb{R}^d$

A set $\Omega\subset\mathbb{R}^d$ is said to tile $\mathbb{R}^d$ by translation (i.e. $\Omega$ is a translational tile) if there exist a discrete set $\Tau$ such that $\bigcup_{t\in\Tau}(\Omega + t)=\mathbb{R}^d$ and $(\Omega + t) \cap (\Omega + t')$ has Lebesgue measure zero for all $t\neq t'$ in $\Tau$.

== Partial results ==
- Fuglede proved in 1974 that the conjecture holds if $\Omega$ is a fundamental domain of a lattice.
- In 2003, Alex Iosevich, Nets Katz and Terence Tao proved that the conjecture holds if $\Omega$ is a convex planar domain.
- In 2004, Terence Tao showed that the conjecture is false on $\mathbb{R}^{d}$ for $d\geq5$. It was later shown by Bálint Farkas, Mihail N. Kolounzakis, Máté Matolcsi and Péter Móra that the conjecture is also false for $d=3$ and $4$. However, the conjecture remains unknown for $d=1,2$.
- In 2015, Alex Iosevich, Azita Mayeli and Jonathan Pakianathan showed that an extension of the conjecture holds in $\mathbb{Z}_{p}\times\mathbb{Z}_{p}$, where $\mathbb{Z}_{p}$ is the cyclic group of order p.
- In 2017, Rachel Greenfeld and Nir Lev proved the conjecture for convex polytopes in $\mathbb{R}^3$.
- In 2019, Nir Lev and Máté Matolcsi settled the conjecture for convex domains affirmatively in all dimensions.
