= Dilation (operator theory) =

In operator theory, a dilation of an operator is the presentation of an operator as a compression of another operator which is functioning under proper operator behavior.

== Hilbert space and dilation ==
Let T be a bounded operator on some Hilbert space H, and H be a subspace of a larger Hilbert space H' . A bounded operator V on H' is a dilation of T if

$$P_H \; V | _H = T$$

where $P_H$ is an orthogonal projection on H. In essence, V is a dilation of T if T is a compression of V.

V is said to be a unitary dilation (respectively, normal, isometric, etc.) if V is unitary (respectively, normal, isometric, etc.). If an operator T has a spectral set $X$, we say that V is a normal boundary dilation or a normal $\partial X$ dilation if V is a normal dilation of T and $\sigma(V)\subseteq \partial X$.

Some texts impose an additional condition. Namely, that a dilation satisfy the following (calculus) property:

$$P_H \; f(V) | _H = f(T)$$

where f(T) is some specified functional calculus (for example, the polynomial or H^{∞} calculus). The utility of a dilation is that it allows the "lifting" of objects associated to T to the level of V, where the lifted objects may have nicer properties. See, for example, the commutant lifting theorem.

== Applications ==
We can show that every contraction on Hilbert spaces has a unitary dilation. A possible construction of this dilation is as follows. For a contraction T, the operator

$$D_T = (I - T^* T)^{\frac{1}{2}}$$

is positive, where the continuous functional calculus is used to define the square root. The operator D_{T} is called the defect operator of T. Let V be the operator on

$$H \oplus H$$

defined by the matrix

$$V =
\begin{bmatrix} T & D_{T^*}\\
\ D_T  &  -T^*
\end{bmatrix}.$$

V is clearly a dilation of T. Also, T(I - T*T) = (I - TT*)T and a limit argument imply

$$T D_T = D_{T^*} T.$$

Using this one can show, by calculating directly, that V is unitary, therefore a unitary dilation of T. This operator V is sometimes called the Julia operator of T.

Notice that when T is a real scalar, say $T = \cos \theta$, we have

$$V =
\begin{bmatrix} \cos \theta & \sin \theta \\
\ \sin \theta  &  - \cos \theta
\end{bmatrix}.$$

which is just the unitary matrix describing rotation by θ. For this reason, the Julia operator V(T) is sometimes called the elementary rotation of T.

We note here that in the above discussion we have not required the calculus property for a dilation. Indeed, direct calculation shows the Julia operator fails to be a "degree-2" dilation in general, i.e. it need not be true that

$$T^2 = P_H \; V^2 | _H$$.

However, it can also be shown that any contraction has a unitary dilation which does have the calculus property above. This is Sz.-Nagy's dilation theorem. More generally, if $\mathcal{R}(X)$ is a Dirichlet algebra, any operator T with $X$ as a spectral set will have a normal $\partial X$ dilation with this property. This generalises Sz.-Nagy's dilation theorem as all contractions have the unit disc as a spectral set.
