= Korostelev =

Korostelev or Korostelyov (feminine Korosteleva or Korostelyova) is a Slavic surname. Notable people with this name include:

- Elena Korosteleva, Belarusian political scientist
- Július Korostelev (1923–2006), Czech footballer
- Natalya Korostelyova (born 1981), Russian cross-country skier
- Olga Barysheva-Korostelyova (born 1954), Russian basketball player
- Olga Korosteleva, Russian-American statistician
- Oleh Korostelyov (born 1949), Ukrainian engineer and scientist
- Pavel Korostelyov (born 1978), Russian cross-country skier
- Savelii Korostelev (born 2003), Russian cross-country skier
