= Khoshnevis =

Khoshnevis is an Iranian surname

- Behrokh Khoshnevis, American inventor, professor, and CEO
- Hesam Khoshnevis (1955–2013), Iranian military officer and Major General

== See also ==
- Davar Khoshnevisan (born 1964), American mathematician
