= Rørdam =

Rørdam is a surname. Notable people with the surname include:

- Mikael Rørdam (born 1959), Danish mathematician
- Thomas Rørdam (born 1952), Danish lawyer
- Thomas Skat Rørdam (1832–1909), Danish priest and theologian
- Valdemar Rørdam (1872–1946), Danish poet and author
