= Ólafía =

Ólafía is a given name. Notable people with the name include:

- Ólafía Einarsdóttir (1924–2017), Icelandic archaeologist
- Ólafía Jóhannsdóttir (1863–1924), Icelandic teacher and temperance worker
- Ólafía Hrönn Jónsdóttir (born 1962), Icelandic actress
- Ólafía Þórunn Kristinsdóttir (born 1992), Icelandic golfer
