= Nicholas Young (mathematician) =

British mathematician

Nicholas John Young is a British mathematician working in operator theory, functional analysis and several complex variables. He is a research professor at the University of Leeds. Much of his work has been about the interaction of operator theory and function theory.

== Publications ==
Young has written more than a hundred papers, over 30 of them in collaboration with Jim Agler. He is the author of the book An Introduction to Hilbert Space.

His Ph.D. adviser was Vlastimil Pták, and he has had 5 Ph.D. students.
