= Oleg Izhboldin =

Russian mathematician (1963–2000)

Oleg Tomovich Izhboldin
- Born: 1963
- Died: 2000 (aged 36–37)
- Education: Saint Petersburg State University
- Scientific career
- Fields: Mathematics
- Workplaces: Saint Petersburg State University

Oleg Tomovich Izhboldin (Russian: Олег Томович Ижболдин; 1963 – 2000) was a Russian mathematician who was first to provide a non-trivial example of an odd u-invariant field solving a classical Kaplansky's conjecture.

Oleg Izhboldin graduated from the 45th Physics-Mathematics School in Saint Petersburg, then from the Faculty of Mathematics and Mechanics of Leningrad State University. He received his Ph.D. from the same university in 1988 and Doktor nauk degree in 2000. According to Alexander Merkurjev: Oleg found his niche in algebra, namely, the algebraic theory of quadratic forms. ... This needed knowledge in different areas of mathematics was especially important in light of the recently discovered interaction (by Oleg, among others) between the theory of quadratic forms and various branches of mathematics that had seemed absolutely unrelated before... Oleg mastered the algebraic theory of quadratic forms very quickly and became one of the acknowledged experts in that field. I was extraordinarily pleased to see him work with Nikita Karpenko... I am a lucky man to have seen both of them do research in algebra so successfully. During a fairly short period of time, together they wrote several very strong papers. The pinnacle of their cooperation led to Oleg’s solution of a very old classical conjecture by Kaplansky. Oleg constructed an example of a field with u-invariant 9 – the very first example of a field with nontrivial odd u-invariant. From my point of view, the proof was as important as the fact itself. It shows us a wonderful pattern of interaction of a some very different techniques and the inner workings of the “algebraic machine” that Oleg discovered and revealed.

Izhboldin died during his short visit to Paris in 2000.
