= Compression (functional analysis) =

In functional analysis, the compression of a linear operator T on a Hilbert space to a subspace K is the operator

$$P_K T \vert_K : K \rightarrow K$$,

where $P_K : H \rightarrow K$ is the orthogonal projection onto K. This is a natural way to obtain an operator on K from an operator on the whole Hilbert space. If K is an invariant subspace for T, then the compression of T to K is the restricted operator K→K sending k to Tk.

More generally, for a linear operator T on a Hilbert space $H$ and an isometry V on a subspace $W$ of $H$, define the compression of T to $W$ by

$$T_W = V^*TV : W \rightarrow W$$,

where $V^*$ is the adjoint of V. If T is a self-adjoint operator, then the compression $T_W$ is also self-adjoint. When V is replaced by the inclusion map $I: W \to H$, $V^* = I^*=P_K : H \to W$, and we acquire the special definition above.

== See also ==
- Dilation (operator theory)
