= Sz.-Nagy's dilation theorem =

Dilation theorem

The Sz.-Nagy dilation theorem (proved by Béla Szőkefalvi-Nagy) states that every contraction $T$ on a Hilbert space $H$ has a unitary dilation $U$ to a Hilbert space $K$, containing $H$, with

$$T^n = P_H U^n \vert_H,\quad n\ge 0,$$

where $P_H$ is the projection from $K$ onto $H$. Moreover, such a dilation is unique (up to unitary equivalence) when one assumes K is minimal, in the sense that the linear span of $\bigcup\nolimits_{n\in \mathbb N} \,U^n H$ is dense in K. When this minimality condition holds, U is called the minimal unitary dilation of T.

== Proof ==
For a contraction T (i.e., ($\|T\|\le1$), its defect operator D_{T} is defined to be the (unique) positive square root D_{T} = (I - T*T)^{½}. In the special case that S is an isometry, D_{S*} is a projector and D_{S}=0, hence the following is an Sz. Nagy unitary dilation of S with the required polynomial functional calculus property:

$$U =
\begin{bmatrix} S & D_{S^*} \\ D_S & -S^* \end{bmatrix}.$$

Returning to the general case of a contraction T, every contraction T on a Hilbert space H has an isometric dilation, again with the calculus property, on

$$\oplus_{n \geq 0} H$$

given by

$$S =
\begin{bmatrix} T & 0 & 0 & \cdots & \\ D_T & 0 & 0 & & \\ 0 & I & 0 & \ddots  \\ 0 & 0 & I & \ddots \\ \vdots & & \ddots & \ddots \end{bmatrix}
.$$

Substituting the S thus constructed into the previous Sz.-Nagy unitary dilation for an isometry S, one obtains a unitary dilation for a contraction T:

$$T^n = P_H S^n \vert_H = P_H (Q_{H'} U \vert_{H'})^n \vert_H = P_H U^n \vert_H.$$

== Schaffer form ==
The Schaffer form of a unitary Sz. Nagy dilation can be viewed as a beginning point for the characterization of all unitary dilations, with the required property, for a given contraction.

== Remarks ==
A generalisation of this theorem, by Berger, Foias and Lebow, shows that if X is a spectral set for T, and

$$\mathcal{R}(X)$$

is a Dirichlet algebra, then T has a minimal normal δX dilation, of the form above. A consequence of this is that any operator with a simply connected spectral set X has a minimal normal δX dilation.

To see that this generalises Sz.-Nagy's theorem, note that contraction operators have the unit disc D as a spectral set, and that normal operators with spectrum in the unit circle δD are unitary.
