= Gail S. Nelson =

American mathematician

Gail Susan Nelson (born 1959) is a mathematician who works as a professor of mathematics at Carleton College.

== Education and career ==
Nelson did her undergraduate studies at the University of North Dakota. She completed her Ph.D. in 1988 at the University of Minnesota. Her dissertation concerned partial differential equations, and was supervised by Eugene Barry Fabes; it was Bounds for the Fundamental Solutions of Degenerate Parabolic Partial Differential Equations. She joined the Carleton College faculty in the same year.

== Books ==
Nelson is the author of two textbooks in mathematics:

- Recurrence and Topology (with John M. Alongi, Graduate Studies in Mathematics 85, American Mathematical Society, 2007), on dynamical systems.
- A User-Friendly Introduction to Lebesgue Measure and Integration (Student Mathematical Library 78, American Mathematical Society, 2015), on Lebesgue integration.

She is also the editor-in-chief of the "Problem Books" book series of the Mathematical Association of America.
