= Skt. Jørgens Gymnasium =

School in Copenhagen, Denmark

Coordinates: 55°40′43″N 12°33′19″E

Skt. Jørgens Gymnasium (1858–1991) was a Danish high school located in Frederiksberg, Copenhagen. It was established in 1858 as Frk. Jessens Forberedelsesskole and changed name to J.V. Jessens Latin- og Realskole in 1889. After yet a name change in 1904 to Henrik Madsens [Latin- og Real]Skole it was taken over by the state in 1919 and changed name to Skt. Jørgens Gymnasium. Girls were admitted from 1950.

In the first half of the twentieth century it was considered an elite school with outstanding teachers.

== Notable students ==
- Per Brinch Hansen (computer scientist)
- Bent Fuglede (mathematician)
- Børge Jessen (mathematician)
- Tom Kristensen (author)
- Henrik Nordbrandt (author)
- Knudåge Riisager (composer)
