= Lei Ni =

Mathematician (born 1969)

Lei Ni (born 1969) is a mathematician. He holds emeritus professor status at the University of California, San Diego (UCSD). He was elected a Fellow of the American Mathematical Society in 2018.

Ni was born in 1969, and from 1987 to 1993 attended Fudan University in China, from where he received a B.S. and M.S. degree in mathematics. He studied at the University of California, Irvine, from 1994 to 1998, and received a Ph.D. in mathematics, advised by Peter Wai-Kwong Li. Ni was an assistant professor at Purdue University from 1998 to 2000 and at Stanford University from 2000 to 2002, before moving to UC San Diego in 2002.

From 2002 to 2005, Ni worked as an assistant professor at UCSD, and from 2005 to 2009 as an associate professor. He received a Sloan Research Fellowship in 2004. Ni served as chair of the mathematics department from 2016 to 2020, during which time, in 2018, he was elected a Fellow of the American Mathematical Society for "contributions to geometric analysis, particularly to Ricci flow, and for mentorship". Since 2025, Ni has been an emeritus professor with Distinguished Professor title, in recognition of his career at the university.

His research areas include geometric analysis, Riemannian geometry, and partial differential equations. He has given talks on these topics to the Simons Laufer Mathematical Sciences Institute. His publications on the Ricci flow include a 2006 book in the Graduate Studies in Mathematics series, and a four-part book in Mathematical Surveys and Monographs.
