= Fuglede's theorem =

In mathematics, Fuglede's theorem is a result in operator theory, named after Bent Fuglede.

== The result ==
Theorem (Fuglede) Let T and N be bounded operators on a complex Hilbert space with N being normal. If TN = NT, then TN* = N*T, where N* denotes the adjoint of N.

Normality of N is necessary, as is seen by taking T=N. When T is self-adjoint, the claim is trivial regardless of whether N is normal:

$$TN^* = (NT)^* = (TN)^* = N^*T.$$

Tentative Proof: If the underlying Hilbert space is finite-dimensional, the spectral theorem says that N is of the form
$$N = \sum\nolimits_i \lambda_i P_i$$
where P_{i} are pairwise orthogonal projections. One expects that TN = NT if and only if TP_{i} = P_{i}T. Indeed, it can be proved to be true by elementary arguments (e.g. it can be shown that all P_{i} are representable as polynomials of N and for this reason, if T commutes with N, it has to commute with P_{i}...). Therefore T must also commute with
$$N^* = \sum\nolimits_i {\bar \lambda_i} P_i.$$

In general, when the Hilbert space is not finite-dimensional, the normal operator N gives rise to a projection-valued measure P on its spectrum, σ(N), which assigns a projection P_{Ω} to each Borel subset of σ(N). N can be expressed as
$$N = \int_{\sigma(N)} \lambda d P(\lambda).$$

Differently from the finite-dimensional case, it is by no means obvious that TN = NT implies TP_{Ω} = P_{Ω}T. Thus, it is not so obvious that T also commutes with any simple function of the form
$$\rho = \sum\nolimits_i {\bar \lambda} P_{\Omega_i}.$$

Indeed, following the construction of the spectral decomposition for a bounded, normal, not self-adjoint, operator T, one sees that to verify that T commutes with $P_{\Omega_i}$, the most straightforward way is to assume that T commutes with both N and N*, giving rise to a vicious circle!

That is the relevance of Fuglede's theorem: The latter hypothesis is not really necessary.

== Putnam's generalization ==
The following contains Fuglede's result as a special case. The proof by Rosenblum pictured below is just that presented by Fuglede for his theorem when assuming N=M.

Theorem (Calvin Richard Putnam) Let T, M, N be linear operators on a complex Hilbert space, and suppose that M and N are normal, T is bounded and MT = TN. Then M*T = TN*.

First proof (Marvin Rosenblum): By induction, the hypothesis implies that M^{k}T = TN^{k} for all k. Thus for any λ in $\Complex$,
$$e^{\bar\lambda M}T = T e^{\bar\lambda N}.$$

Consider the function
$$F(\lambda) = e^{\lambda M^*} T e^{-\lambda N^*}.$$
This is equal to
$$e^{\lambda M^*} \left[e^{-\bar\lambda M}T e^{\bar\lambda N}\right] e^{-\lambda N^*} = U(\lambda) T V(\lambda)^{-1},$$
where $U(\lambda) = e^{\lambda M^* - \bar\lambda M}$ because $M$ is normal, and similarly $V(\lambda) = e^{\lambda N^* - \bar\lambda N}$. However we have
$$U(\lambda)^* = e^{\bar\lambda M - \lambda M^*} = U(\lambda)^{-1}$$
so U is unitary, and hence has norm 1 for all λ; the same is true for V(λ), so
$$\|F(\lambda)\| \le \|T\|\ \forall \lambda.$$

So F is a bounded analytic vector-valued function, and is thus constant, and equal to F(0) = T. Considering the first-order terms in the expansion for small λ, we must have M*T = TN*.

The original paper of Fuglede appeared in 1950; it was extended to the form given above by Putnam in 1951. The short proof given above was first published by Rosenblum in 1958; it is very elegant, but is less general than the original proof which also considered the case of unbounded operators. Another simple proof of Putnam's theorem is as follows:

Second proof: Consider the matrices

$$T' = \begin{bmatrix} 0 & 0 \\ T & 0 \end{bmatrix}
\quad \text{and} \quad
N' = \begin{bmatrix} N & 0 \\ 0 & M \end{bmatrix}.$$

The operator N' is normal and, by assumption, T' N' = N' T' . By Fuglede's theorem, one has
$$T' (N')^* = (N')^*T'.$$

Comparing entries then gives the desired result.

From Putnam's generalization, one can deduce the following:

Corollary If two normal operators M and N are similar, then they are unitarily equivalent.

Proof: Suppose MS = SN where S is a bounded invertible operator. Putnam's result implies M*S = SN*, i.e.
$$S^{-1} M^* S = N^*.$$

Take the adjoint of the above equation and we have
$$S^* M (S^{-1})^* = N.$$

So
$$S^* M (S^{-1})^* = S^{-1} M S \quad \Rightarrow \quad SS^* M (SS^*)^{-1} = M.$$

Let S*=VR, with V a unitary (since S is invertible) and R the positive square root of SS*. As R is a limit of polynomials on SS*, the above implies that R commutes with M. It is also invertible. Then
$$N = S^*M (S^*)^{-1}=VRMR^{-1}V^*=VMV^*.$$

Corollary If M and N are normal operators, and MN = NM, then MN is also normal.

Proof: The argument invokes only Fuglede's theorem. One can directly compute
$$(MN) (MN)^* = MN (NM)^* = MN M^* N^*.$$

By Fuglede, the above becomes
$$= M M^* N N^*.$$

But M and N are normal, so
$$= M^* M N^*N.$$

By Fuglede (again), the above becomes
$$= M^* N^* MN = (NM)^* MN$$

and the hypothesis MN = NM shows that it is
$$= (MN)^* MN.$$

== C*-algebras ==
The theorem can be rephrased as a statement about elements of C*-algebras.

Theorem (Fuglede-Putnam-Rosenblum) Let x, y be two normal elements of a C*-algebra A and z such that xz = zy. Then it follows that x* z = z y*.

Remark
For further results, generalizations, and applications of the Fuglede–Putnam theorem, readers may consult the survey monograph The Fuglede–Putnam Theory by M. H. Mortad (Springer, 2022).
