= Jessen–Wintner theorem =

Mathematical theory

In mathematics, the Jessen–Wintner theorem, introduced by Jessen and Wintner (1935), asserts that a random variable of Jessen–Wintner type, meaning the sum of an almost surely convergent series of independent discrete random variables, is of pure type.
