= Vlastimil Pták =

Czech mathematician (1925–1999)

Vlastimil Pták (Czech pronunciation: [ˈvlascɪmɪl ˈptaːk]; 8 November 1925 in Prague – 5 May 1999) was a Czech mathematician. He worked in functional analysis, theoretical numerical analysis, and linear algebra. Notable early work include generalizations of the open mapping theorem.

During 1945–1949, Vlastimil Pták studied mathematics and physics at the Charles University in Prague. Later, he worked at the university and since 1952 in Mathematical Institute of Czechoslovak Academy of Sciences. In 1965 he was named professor at the Charles University. He has published more than 160 mathematical research papers. He had three Ph.D. students: Nicholas Young, Michal Zajac and Miroslav Engliš.

== Selected publications ==
- Completeness and the open mapping theorem. Bull. Soc. Math. France 86 1958 41–74. Text online
- On complete topological linear spaces. Czechoslovak Math. J. 3(78), (1953). 301–364.
- On matrices with non-positive off-diagonal elements and positive principal minors. (with Miroslav Fiedler) Czechoslovak Math. J. 12 (87) 1962 382–400.
