= Aurel Wintner =

- Born: 8 April 1903; Budapest, Hungary
- Died: 15 January 1958 (aged 54); Baltimore, Maryland, United States
- Education: University of Leipzig
- Known for: Jessen–Wintner theorem Wiener-Wintner theorem
- Scientific career
- Fields: Mathematics
- Workplaces: Johns Hopkins University
- Doctoral advisor: Leon Lichtenstein
- Doctoral students: Shlomo Sternberg; Philip Hartman

Aurel Friedrich Wintner (8 April 1903 – 15 January 1958) was a mathematician noted for his research in mathematical analysis, number theory, differential equations and probability theory. He was one of the founders of probabilistic number theory. He received his Ph.D. from the University of Leipzig in 1928 under the guidance of Leon Lichtenstein. He taught at Johns Hopkins University.

He was a nephew of the astronomer Samuel Oppenheim, and the son-in-law of mathematician Otto Hölder.

== Works ==
- Spektraltheorie der unendlichen Matrizen, 1929
- The Analytical Foundations of Celestial Mechanics, 1941 (reprinted in 2014 by Dover)
- Eratosthenian Averages, 1943
- The Theory of Measure in Arithmetical Semi-Groups, 1944
- An Arithmetical Approach to Ordinary Fourier Series, 1945
- The Fourier Transforms of Probability Distributions, 1947
