= John B. Conway =

American mathematician (1939–2024)

- Born: September 22, 1939; New Orleans, Louisiana, United States
- Died: February 17, 2024 (aged 84)
- Education: Loyola University (BS); Louisiana State University (PhD)
- Known for: Complex analysis Operator algebra
- Spouse: Ann Conway
- Children: 1
- Scientific career
- Fields: Mathematics
- Workplaces: The George Washington University
- Thesis: The Strict Topology and Compactness in the Space of Measures (1966)
- Doctoral advisor: Heron S. Collins
- Doctoral students: Jim Agler (1980)

John Bligh Conway (September 22, 1939 - February 17, 2024) was an American mathematician. He was a professor at the George Washington University, officially retiring in 2011 and continuing as a professor emeritus until his death in 2024. He specialized in functional analysis, particularly bounded operators on Hilbert spaces.

Conway earned his Bachelor of Science from Loyola University and Ph.D. from Louisiana State University under the direction of Heron Collins in 1965, with a dissertation on The Strict Topology and Compactness in the Space of Measures. He had 20 students who obtained doctorates under his supervision, most of them at Indiana University, where he was a close friend of mathematician Max Zorn. He served on the faculty there from 1965 to 1990, when he became head of the mathematics department at the University of Tennessee.

He was the author of a two-volume series on Functions of One Complex Variable (Springer-Verlag), which is a standard graduate text for courses on complex analysis. He also wrote texts on operator algebras, including a general text on the subject titled A Course in Operator Theory (American Mathematical Society) and two texts on his specialty of subnormal operators, titled The Theory of Subnormal Operators (American Mathematical Society) and Subnormal Operators (Pitman Books Ltd.) respectively.

== Selected publications ==
- Conway, John B. (1973). "A complete Boolean algebra of subspaces which is not reflexive". Bull. Amer. Math. Soc. 79 (4): 720–722. doi:10.1090/S0002-9904-1973-13279-3.
- Conway, John B. (1978). Functions of One Complex Variable I. Graduate Texts in Mathematics. Vol. 11. Springer-Verlag. ISBN 978-0-387-90328-6.
- Conway, John B. (1981). Subnormal Operators. Pitman Books Ltd. ISBN 978-0-8218-2184-8.
- Conway, John B. (1990). A Course in Functional Analysis. Graduate Texts in Mathematics. Vol. 96 (2nd ed.). New York: Springer-Verlag. ISBN 978-0-387-97245-9. OCLC 21195908.
- Conway, John B. (1991). The Theory of Subnormal Operators. American Mathematical Society. ISBN 978-0-8218-1536-6.
- Conway, John B. (1995). Functions of One Complex Variable II. Graduate Texts in Mathematics. Vol. 159. Springer-Verlag. ISBN 978-0-387-94460-9.
- Conway, John B. (1996). On Being a Department Head: A Personal View. American Mathematical Society. ISBN 978-0-8218-0615-9.
- Conway, John B. (1999). A Course in Operator Theory. Graduate Studies in Mathematics. Vol. 21. American Mathematical Society. ISBN 978-0-8218-2065-0.
