= Fibonacci group =

Algebraic structure

In mathematics, for a natural number $n \ge 2$, the nth Fibonacci group, denoted $F(2,n)$ or sometimes $F(n)$, is defined by n generators $a_1, a_2, \dots, a_n$ and n relations:

- $a_1 a_2 = a_3,$
- $a_2 a_3 = a_4,$
- $\dots$
- $a_{n-2} a_{n-1} = a_n,$
- $a_{n-1}a_n = a_1,$
- $a_n a_1 = a_2$.

These groups were introduced by John Conway in 1965.

The group $F(2,n)$ is of finite order for $n=2,3,4,5,7$ (order 1,8,5,11,29, respectively), and infinite order for $n = 6$ and $n \ge 8$. The infinitude of $F(2,9)$ was proved by computer in 1990.

== Kaplansky's unit conjecture ==
From a group $G$ and a field $K$ (or more generally a ring), the group ring $K[G]$ is defined as the set of all finite formal $K$-linear combinations of elements of $G$ − that is, an element $a$ of $K[G]$ is of the form $a = \sum_{g \in G} \lambda_g g$, where $\lambda_g = 0$ for all but finitely many $g \in G$ so that the linear combination is finite. The (size of the) support of an element $a = \sum\nolimits_g \lambda_g g$ in $K[G]$, denoted $|\operatorname{supp} a\,|$, is the number of elements $g \in G$ such that $\lambda_g \neq 0$, i.e. the number of terms in the linear combination. The ring structure of $K[G]$ is the "obvious" one: the linear combinations are added "component-wise", i.e. as $\sum\nolimits_g \lambda_g g + \sum\nolimits_g \mu_g g = \sum\nolimits_g (\lambda_g \!+\! \mu_g) g$, whose support is also finite, and multiplication is defined by $\left(\sum\nolimits_g \lambda_g g\right)\!\!\left(\sum\nolimits_h \mu_h h\right) = \sum\nolimits_{g,h} \lambda_g\mu_h \, gh$, whose support is again finite, and which can be written in the form $\sum_{x \in G} \nu_x x$ as $\sum_{x \in G}\Bigg(\sum_{g,h \in G \atop gh = x} \lambda_g\mu_h \!\Bigg) x$.

Kaplansky's unit conjecture states that given a field $K$ and a torsion-free group $G$ (a group in which all non-identity elements have infinite order), the group ring $K[G]$ does not contain any non-trivial units – that is, if $ab = 1$ in $K[G]$ then $a = kg$ for some $k \in K$ and $g \in G$. Giles Gardam disproved this conjecture in February 2021 by providing a counterexample. He took $K = \mathbb{F}_2$, the finite field with two elements, and he took $G$ to be the 6th Fibonacci group $F(2,6)$. The non-trivial unit $\alpha \in \mathbb{F}_2[F(2, 6)]$ he discovered has $|\operatorname{supp} \alpha\,| = |\operatorname{supp} \alpha^{-1}| = 21$.

The 6th Fibonacci group $F(2,6)$ has also been variously referred to as the Hantzsche-Wendt group, the Passman group, and the Promislow group.
