= Heinz Engl =

Austrian mathematician

Heinz Werner Engl
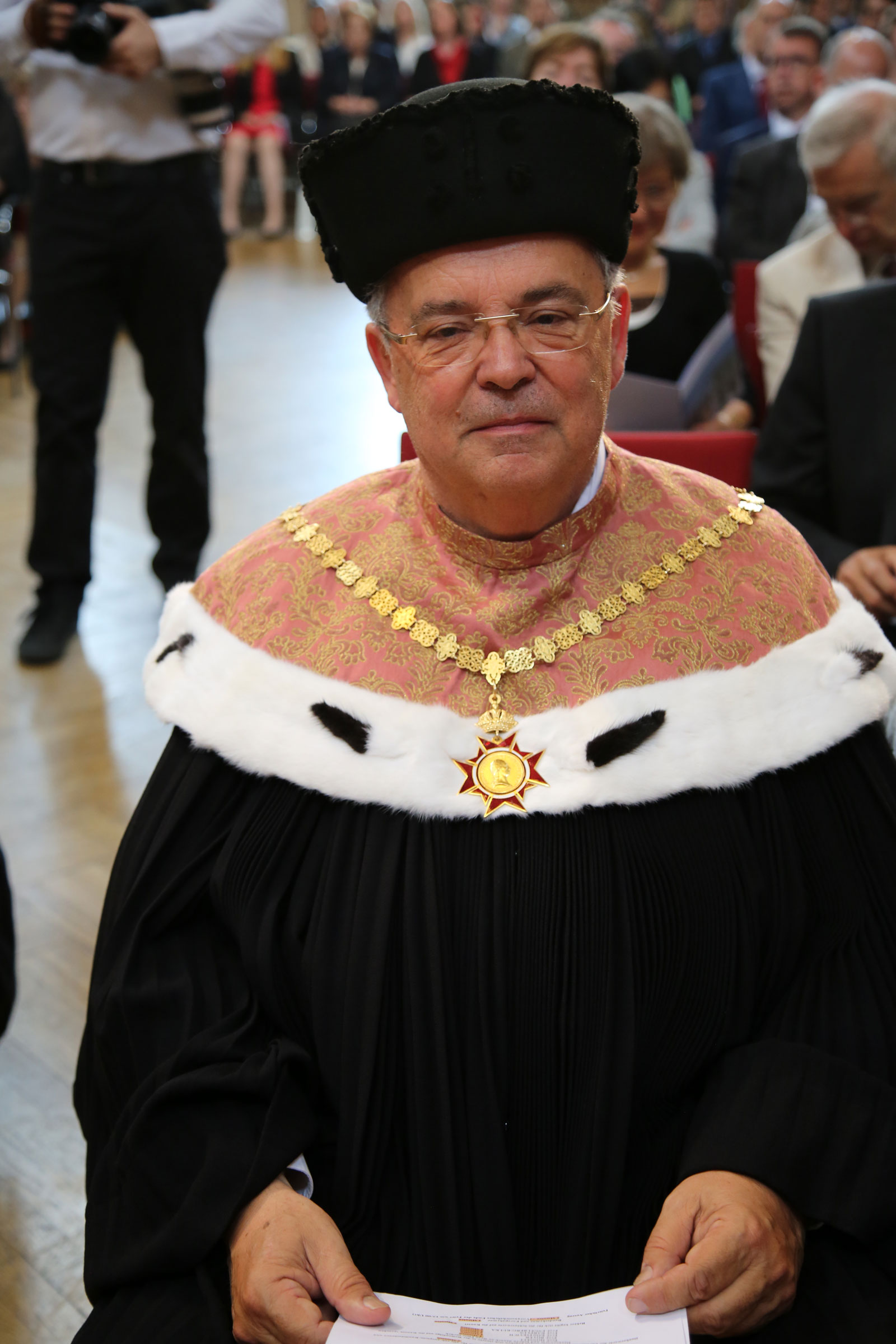

Former Rector of the University of Vienna
- In office 1 October 2011 – 30 September 2022
- Preceded by: Georg Winckler
- Succeeded by: Sebastian Schütze

Personal details
- Born: 28 March 1953 (age 73) Linz
- Spouse: Rosa Engl
- Children: Elisabeth Engl, Magdalena Engl
- Education: Johannes Kepler University Linz (JKU)

Heinz Werner Engl (born 28 March 1953) is an Austrian mathematician who served as the rector of the University of Vienna.

Engl was born in Linz. He studied at the Johannes Kepler University of Linz, where he earned an engineering diploma in technical mathematics in 1975, a doctorate in 1977, and a habilitation in 1979. He worked at the University of Linz starting in 1976 as an assistant professor, was promoted and tenured in 1981, and became a full professor in 1988. His research in this period concerned inverse problems in applied mathematics, with students including Barbara Kaltenbacher. He became vice-rector of the University of Vienna in 2007, and rector in 2011.

With Martin Hanke and Andreas Neubauer he is the author of the book Regularization of Inverse Problems (Mathematics and its Applications 375, Kluwer Academic Publishers, 1996).

Engl won the Theodor Körner Prize in 1978, the Wilhelm Exner Medal in 1998, and the ICIAM Pioneer Prize (jointly with Ingrid Daubechies) in 2007. He became a corresponding member of the Austrian Academy of Sciences in 2000, and a full member in 2003. He became a fellow of the Society for Industrial and Applied Mathematics in 2009, an inaugural fellow of the American Mathematical Society in 2012, and a member of Academia Europaea in 2013. He is also a member of the European Academy of Sciences and Arts. In 2012, Saarland University awarded him an honorary doctorate.

He was a member of the Rotary Club Linz Süd from 1994 to 2012 and has been a member of the Rotary Club Vienna ever since.

Heinz Engl is married and, according to his own statement, grandfather of Eleon Engl-Misirlisoy, the New Year's baby 2020 of the US capital Washington D.C.
