= Lawrence G. Brown =

American mathematician

Lawrence G. Brown (February 6, 1943 – April 26, 2026) was an American mathematician who studies operator algebras.

Brown studied at Harvard University, graduating in 1968 with George Mackey as his advisor and his thesis On the Structure of Locally Compact Groups. He was a professor at Purdue University until his retirement.

With Peter A. Fillmore and Ronald G. Douglas, he developed the Brown-Douglas-Fillmore theory in the theory of operator algebras based on techniques of algebraic topology.

== See also ==
- Real rank (C*-algebras)
- Brown measure
