= Sarason interpolation theorem =

Theorem in mathematical analysis

In mathematics complex analysis, the Sarason interpolation theorem, introduced by Sarason (1967), is a generalization of the Caratheodory interpolation theorem and Nevanlinna–Pick interpolation.
