= Fundamentals of the Theory of Operator Algebras =

Fundamentals of the Theory of Operator Algebras is a four-volume textbook on the classical theory of operator algebras written by Richard Kadison and John Ringrose. The first two volumes, published in 1983 and 1986, are entitled (I) Elementary Theory and (II) Advanced Theory; the latter two volumes, published in 1991 and 1992, present complete solutions to the exercises in volumes I and II.

== Contents ==
- Volume I: Elementary Theory

Chapter 1. Linear spaces
Chapter 2. Basics of Hilbert Space and Linear Operators
Chapter 3. Banach Algebras
Chapter 4. Elementary C*-Algebra Theory
Chapter 5. Elementary von Neumann Algebra Theory

- Volume II: Advanced Theory

Chapter 6. Comparison Theory of Projection
Chapter 7. Normal States and Unitary Equivalence of von Neumann Algebras
Chapter 8. The Trace
Chapter 9. Algebra and Commutant
Chapter 10. Special Representation of C*-Algebras
Chapter 11. Tensor Products
Chapter 12. Approximation by Matrix Algebras
Chapter 13. Crossed Products
Chapter 14. Direct Integrals and Decompositions

Volumes III and IV follow Volumes I and II chapter-by-chapter with solutions to the exercises.

== Reception ==
According to Nick Lord (writing for The Mathematical Gazette), the two volumes "met with immediate acclaim from functional analysts as a clear, careful, self-contained introduction to C*- and von Neumann algebra theory", something many in the field felt was missing. Ringrose and Kadison wrote with a pedagogical goal in mind, purposefully keeping the references sparse and including a long list of exercises. These exercises have been described as "outstanding" and the solutions, in the later volumes, have been similarly commended. They wrote of their textbook that:

[Its] primary goal is to teach the subject and lead the reader to the point where the vast recent literature, both in the subject proper and in its many applications, becomes accessible. Although we have put major emphasis on making the material presented clear and understandable, the subject is not easy; no account, however lucid, can make it so.

Gert K. Pederson wrote in 1994 of the volumes' popularity:

The theory [of operator algebras] has certainly come of age and has become fashionable. At the same time, the demand for concise textbooks that cover the subject has become noticeable [...] Fundamentals in the theory of operator algebras [...] have quickly established themselves as The Textbooks in Operator Algebra Theory. [...] The 715 exercises serve to illustrate and extend the results and examples in the text, but also help the reader to develop working techniques and facility with the subject matter. Some are routine, requiring nothing more than a clear understanding of a definition or a result for their solution. Other exercises (and groups of exercises) constitute small (guided) research projects. Anyone who claims to have solved them all is either boasting or is truly a master of our subject.
