= Mikael Rørdam =

Danish mathematician

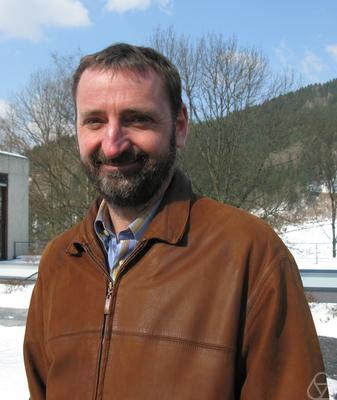
Rørdam at Oberwolfach in 2010

Mikael Rørdam (born 7 January 1959, Copenhagen) is a Danish mathematician, specializing in the theory of operator algebras and its applications.

== Education and career ==
Rørdam graduated with master's degree from the University of Copenhagen in 1984. He received his PhD from the University of Pennsylvania with thesis The theory of unitary rank and regular approximation under the supervision of Richard Kadison. In the spring of 1988 Rørdam was a postdoc at the University of Toronto. At Odense University he was an Adjunkt (assistant professor) from 1988 to 1991 and a Lektor (associate professor) from 1991 to 1997. He was a Lektor at the University of Copenhagen from 1998 to 2002 and full professor from 2002 to 2007 at the University of Southern Denmark. Since 2008 he is a full professor at the University of Copenhagen.

Rørdam was elected a member of the Royal Danish Academy of Sciences and Letters in 2004. He was an invited speaker of the International Congress of Mathematicians in 2006 in Madrid. He was a member of the board of the Mittag-Leffler Institute from 2010 to 2016. He was a plenary speaker at the International Workshop on Operator Theory and its Applications (IWOTA) in 2018 in Shanghai.

== Selected publications ==
=== Articles ===
- Rørdam, Mikael (1991). "On the structure of simple C*-algebras tensored with a UHF-algebra". Journal of Functional Analysis. 100 (1): 1–17. doi:10.1016/0022-1236(91)90098-P. ISSN 0022-1236.
- Rørdam, Mikael (1992). "On the structure of simple C*-algebras tensored with a UHF-algebra, II". Journal of Functional Analysis. 107 (2): 255–269. doi:10.1016/0022-1236(92)90106-S.
- Blackadar, Bruce; Rørdam, Mikael (1992). "Extending states on preordered semigroups and the existence of quasitraces on C*-algebras". Journal of Algebra. 152 (1): 240–247. doi:10.1016/0021-8693(92)90098-7. ISSN 0021-8693.
- Rørdam, M. (1995). "Classification of Certain Infinite Simple C*-Algebras". Journal of Functional Analysis. 131 (2): 415–458. doi:10.1006/jfan.1995.1095.
- Kirchberg, Eberhard; Rørdam, Mikael (2000). "Non-simple purely infinite C*-algebras". American Journal of Mathematics. 122 (3): 637–666. doi:10.1353/ajm.2000.0021. S2CID 18204703.
- Kirchberg, Eberhard; Rørdam, Mikael (2002). "Infinite Non-simple C*-Algebras: Absorbing the Cuntz Algebra O_{∞}". Advances in Mathematics. 167 (2): 195–264. doi:10.1006/aima.2001.2041.
- Rørdam, M. (2002). "Classification of Nuclear, Simple C*-algebras". Classification of Nuclear C*-Algebras. Entropy in Operator Algebras. Encyclopaedia of Mathematical Sciences. Vol. 126. pp. 1–145. doi:10.1007/978-3-662-04825-2_1. ISBN 978-3-642-07605-3.
- Rørdam, Mikael (2003). "A simple C*-algebra with a finite and an infinite projection". Acta Mathematica. 191 (1): 109–142. arXiv:math/0204339. doi:10.1007/BF02392697. S2CID 11212596.
- Rørdam, Mikael (2004). "The stable and the real rank of $z$-absorbing C*-algebras". International Journal of Mathematics. 15 (10): 1065–1084. arXiv:math/0408020. doi:10.1142/S0129167X04002661. 2004
- Rørdam, Mikael; Winter, Wilhelm (2010). "The Jiang–Su algebra revisited". Journal für die Reine und Angewandte Mathematik. 2010 (642). arXiv:0801.2259. doi:10.1515/crelle.2010.039. S2CID 14639268.
- Rørdam, Mikael (2019). "Fixed-points in the cone of traces on a C*-algebra". Transactions of the American Mathematical Society. 371 (12): 8879–8906. arXiv:1803.11075. doi:10.1090/tran/7797. ISSN 0002-9947.

=== Books ===
- Rørdam, M.; Larsen, Flemming; Laustsen, N. J. (2000-07-20). An Introduction to K-Theory for C*-Algebras. ISBN 9780521789448.
- Rørdam, M.; Størmer, Erling (2001-11-20). Classification of Nuclear C*-Algebras. Entropy in Operator Algebras. ISBN 9783540423058.
