= Nevanlinna–Pick interpolation =

Problem in complex analysis

In complex analysis, given initial data consisting of $n$ points $\lambda_1, \ldots, \lambda_n$ in the complex unit disk $\mathbb{D}$ and target data consisting of $n$ points $z_1, \ldots, z_n$ in $\mathbb{D}$, the Nevanlinna–Pick interpolation problem is to find a holomorphic function $\varphi$ that interpolates the data, that is for all $i \in \{1,...,n\}$,

$$\varphi(\lambda_i) = z_i$$,

subject to the constraint $\left\vert \varphi(\lambda) \right\vert \le 1$ for all $\lambda \in \mathbb{D}$.

Georg Pick and Rolf Nevanlinna solved the problem independently in 1916 and 1919 respectively, showing that an interpolating function exists if and only if a matrix defined in terms of the initial and target data is positive semi-definite.

== Background ==
The Nevanlinna–Pick theorem represents an $n$-point generalization of the Schwarz lemma. The invariant form of the Schwarz lemma states that for a holomorphic function $f:\mathbb{D}\to\mathbb{D}$, for all $\lambda_1, \lambda_2 \in \mathbb{D}$,

$$\left|\frac{f(\lambda_1) - f(\lambda_2)}{1 - \overline{f(\lambda_2)}f(\lambda_1)}\right| \leq \left|\frac{\lambda_1 - \lambda_2}{1 - \overline{\lambda_2}\lambda_1}\right|.$$

Setting $f(\lambda_i)=z_i$, this inequality is equivalent to the statement that the matrix given by

$$\begin{bmatrix} \frac{1 - |z_1|^2}{1 - |\lambda_1|^2} & \frac{1 - \overline{z_1}z_2}{1 - \overline{\lambda_1}\lambda_2}
\\[5pt] \frac{1 - \overline{z_2}z_1}{1 - \overline{\lambda_2}\lambda_1} & \frac{1 - |z_2|^2}{1 - |\lambda_2|^2} \end{bmatrix} \geq 0,$$

that is the Pick matrix is positive semidefinite.

Combined with the Schwarz lemma, this leads to the observation that for $\lambda_1, \lambda_2, z_1, z_2 \in \mathbb{D}$, there exists a holomorphic function $\varphi:\mathbb{D} \to \mathbb{D}$ such that $\varphi(\lambda_1) = z_1$ and $\varphi(\lambda_2)=z_2$ if and only if the Pick matrix

$$\left(\frac{1 - \overline{z_j}z_i}{1 - \overline{\lambda_j}\lambda_i}\right)_{i,j = 1, 2} \geq 0.$$

== The Nevanlinna–Pick theorem ==
The Nevanlinna–Pick theorem states the following. Given $\lambda_1, \ldots, \lambda_n, z_1, \ldots, z_n \in \mathbb{D}$, there exists a holomorphic function $\varphi:\mathbb{D} \to \overline{\mathbb{D}}$ such that $\varphi(\lambda_i) = z_i$ if and only if the Pick matrix

$$\left( \frac{1-\overline{z_j} z_i}{1-\overline{\lambda_j} \lambda_i} \right)_{i,j=1}^n$$

is positive semi-definite. Furthermore, the function $\varphi$ is unique if and only if the Pick matrix has zero determinant. In this case, $\varphi$ is a Blaschke product, with degree equal to the rank of the Pick matrix (except in the trivial case where all the $z_i$'s are the same).

== Generalization ==
The generalization of the Nevanlinna–Pick theorem became an area of active research in operator theory following the work of Donald Sarason on the Sarason interpolation theorem. Sarason gave a new proof of the Nevanlinna–Pick theorem using Hilbert space methods in terms of operator contractions. Other approaches were developed in the work of L. de Branges, and B. Sz.-Nagy and C. Foias.

It can be shown that the Hardy space H^{2} is a reproducing kernel Hilbert space, and that its reproducing kernel (known as the Szegő kernel) is

$$K(a,b)=\left(1-b \bar{a} \right)^{-1}.\,$$

Because of this, the Pick matrix can be rewritten as

$$\left( (1-z_i \overline{z_j}) K(\lambda_j,\lambda_i)\right)_{i,j=1}^N.\,$$

This description of the solution has motivated various attempts to generalise Nevanlinna and Pick's result.

The Nevanlinna–Pick problem can be generalised to that of finding a holomorphic function $f:R\to\mathbb{D}$ that interpolates a given set of data, where R is now an arbitrary region of the complex plane.

M. B. Abrahamse showed that if the boundary of R consists of finitely many analytic curves (say n + 1), then an interpolating function f exists if and only if

$$\left( (1-z_i \overline{z_j}) K_\tau (\lambda_j,\lambda_i)\right)_{i,j=1}^N\,$$

is a positive semi-definite matrix, for all $\tau$ in the n-torus. Here, the $K_\tau$s are the reproducing kernels corresponding to a particular set of reproducing kernel Hilbert spaces, which are related to the set R. It can also be shown that f is unique if and only if one of the Pick matrices has zero determinant.

== Notes ==
- Pick's original proof concerned functions with positive real part. Under a linear fractional Cayley transform, his result holds on maps from the disk to the disk.
- Pick–Nevanlinna interpolation was introduced into robust control by Allen Tannenbaum.
- The Pick–Nevanlinna problem for holomorphic maps from the bidisk $\mathbb{D}^2$ to the disk was solved by Jim Agler.
