= Pisier–Ringrose inequality =

In mathematics, Pisier–Ringrose inequality is an inequality in the theory of C*-algebras which was proved by Gilles Pisier in 1978 affirming a conjecture of John Ringrose. It is an extension of the Grothendieck inequality.

== Statement ==
Theorem. If $\gamma$ is a bounded, linear mapping of one C*-algebra $\mathfrak{A}$ into another C*-algebra $\mathfrak{B}$, then

$$\left\|\sum_{j=1}^n \gamma(A_j)^* \gamma(A_j) + \gamma(A_j) \gamma(A_j)^*\right\| \le 4 \|\gamma \|^2 \left\| \sum_{j=1}^n A_j^*A_j + A_j A_j^* \right\|$$

for each finite set $\{ A_1, A_2, \ldots, A_n \}$ of elements $A_j$ of $\mathfrak{A}$.

== See also ==
- Haagerup-Pisier inequality
- Christensen-Haagerup Principle
