= Richard Kadison =

American mathematician

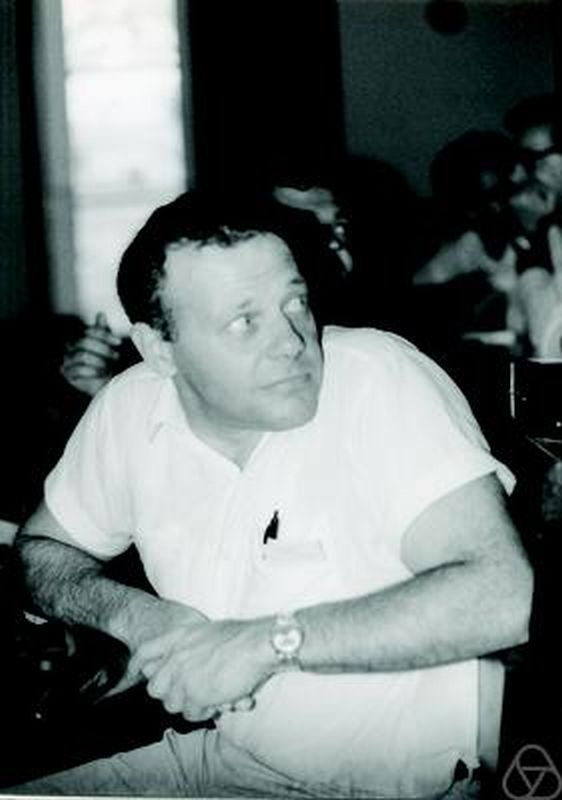
- Born: July 25, 1925; New York City, New York, U.S.
- Died: August 22, 2018 (aged 93); Narberth, Pennsylvania, U.S.
- Education: University of Chicago
- Known for: Kadison–Kaplansky conjecture Kadison's inequality Kadison–Singer problem Kadison transitivity theorem Kadison–Kastler metric
- Awards: Steele Prize (1999)
- Scientific career
- Fields: Mathematics
- Institutions: University of Pennsylvania
- Thesis: A Unified Representation Theory for Topological Algebra (1950)
- Doctoral advisor: Marshall Harvey Stone
- Doctoral students: James Glimm; Richard Lashof; Marc Rieffel; Mikael Rørdam; Erling Størmer

Richard Vincent Kadison (July 25, 1925 – August 22, 2018) was an American mathematician known for his contributions to the study of operator algebras.

== Career ==
Born in New York City in 1925, Kadison was a Gustave C. Kuemmerle Professor in the Department of Mathematics of the University of Pennsylvania.

Kadison was a member of the U.S. National Academy of Sciences (elected in 1996), and a foreign member of the Royal Danish Academy of Sciences and Letters (elected 1974) and of the Norwegian Academy of Science and Letters. He was a 1969 Guggenheim Fellow.

Kadison was awarded the 1999 Leroy P. Steele Prize for Lifetime Achievement by the American Mathematical Society. In 2012, he became a fellow of the American Mathematical Society.

== Personal life ==
Kadison served as an officer in the merchant marines for several years after 1943. He was a skilled gymnast with a specialty in rings, making the 1952 US Olympic Team but later withdrawing due to an injury. He married Karen M. Holm on June 5, 1956, and they had one son, Lars.

Kadison died after a short illness on August 22, 2018.

== Selected publications ==
=== Books ===
- with John Ringrose: Fundamentals of the Theory of Operator Algebras 2 vols., Academic Press 1983; new edition, Fundamentals of the theory of operator algebras: Elementary theory, Vol. 1, 1997 Fundamentals of the theory of operator algebras: Advanced theory, Vol. 2, 1997 AMS 1997
- with John Ringrose: Fundamentals of the theory of operator algebras, III-IV. An exercise approach, Birkhäuser, Basel, III: 1991, xiv+273 pp., ISBN 0-8176-3497-5; IV: 1992, xiv+586 pp., ISBN 0-8176-3498-3

=== PNAS articles ===
- Kadison, R. V. (1998). "On representations of finite type". Proc Natl Acad Sci U S A. 95 (23): 13392–6. Bibcode:1998PNAS...9513392K. doi:10.1073/pnas.95.23.13392. PMC 24829. PMID 9811810.
- with I. M. Singer: Kadison, R. V.; Singer, I. M. (1952). "Some Remarks on Representations of Connected Groups". Proc Natl Acad Sci U S A. 38 (5): 419–23. Bibcode:1952PNAS...38..419K. doi:10.1073/pnas.38.5.419. PMC 1063576. PMID 16589115.
- with Bent Fuglede: Fuglede, B.; Kadison, R. V. (1951). "On a Conjecture of Murray and von Neumann". Proc Natl Acad Sci U S A. 37 (7): 420–5. Bibcode:1951PNAS...37..420F. doi:10.1073/pnas.37.7.420. PMC 1063392. PMID 16578376.
- with Zhe Liu: Kadison, Richard V.; Liu, Zhe (2014). "A note on derivations of Murray–von Neumann algebras". Proc Natl Acad Sci U S A. 111 (6): 2087–93. Bibcode:2014PNAS..111.2087K. doi:10.1073/pnas.1321358111. PMC 3926033. PMID 24469831.
- Kadison, R. V. (2002). "The Pythagorean Theorem: II. The infinite discrete case". Proc Natl Acad Sci U S A. 99 (8): 5217–22. Bibcode:2002PNAS...99.5217K. doi:10.1073/pnas.032677299. PMC 122749. PMID 16578869.
- Kadison, R. V. (2002). "The Pythagorean Theorem: I. The finite case". Proc Natl Acad Sci U S A. 99 (7): 4178–84. Bibcode:2002PNAS...99.4178K. doi:10.1073/pnas.032677199. PMC 123622. PMID 11929992.
- Kadison, R. V. (1957). "Irreducible Operator Algebras". Proc Natl Acad Sci U S A. 43 (3): 273–6. Bibcode:1957PNAS...43..273K. doi:10.1073/pnas.43.3.273. PMC 528430. PMID 16590013.
- Kadison, R. V. (1955). "On the Additivity of the Trace in Finite Factors". Proc Natl Acad Sci U S A. 41 (6): 385–7. Bibcode:1955PNAS...41..385K. doi:10.1073/pnas.41.6.385. PMC 528101. PMID 16589685.
- Kadison, R. V. (1955). "Multiplicity Theory for Operator Algebras". Proc Natl Acad Sci U S A. 41 (3): 169–73. Bibcode:1955PNAS...41..169K. doi:10.1073/pnas.41.3.169. PMC 528046. PMID 16589638.
- with Bent Fuglede: Fuglede, B.; Kadison, R. V. (1951). "On Determinants and a Property of the Trace in Finite Factors". Proc Natl Acad Sci U S A. 37 (7): 425–31. Bibcode:1951PNAS...37..425F. doi:10.1073/pnas.37.7.425. PMC 1063393. PMID 16578377.
