= Børge Jessen =

Danish mathematician (1907–1993)

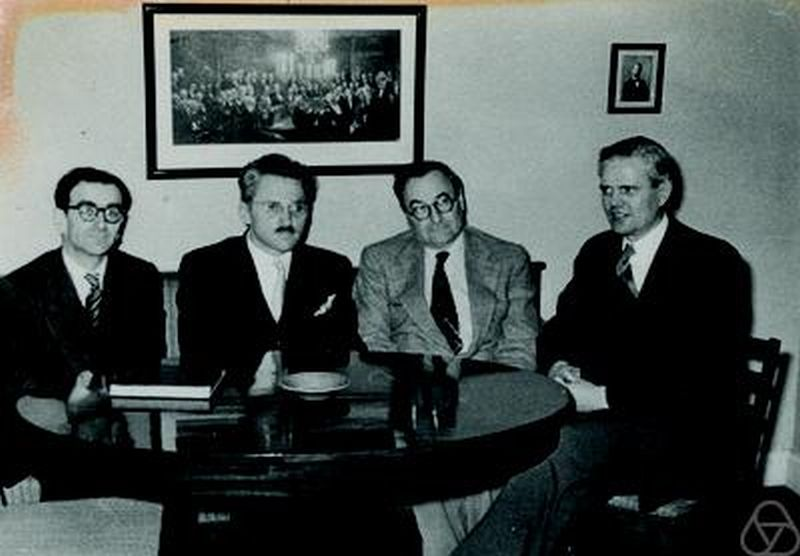
- Jessen (right) with Werner Fenchel, A.D. Alexandrov and Herbert Busemann in 1954
- Born: 19 June 1907
- Died: 20 March 1993 (aged 85)
- Education: University of Copenhagen
- Scientific career
- Fields: Mathematics

Børge Christian Jessen (19 June 1907 – 20 March 1993) was a Danish mathematician best known for his work in analysis, specifically on the Riemann zeta function, and in geometry, specifically on Hilbert's third problem.

== Early years ==
Jessen was born on 19 June 1907 in Copenhagen to Hans Jessen and Christine Jessen (née Larsen). He attended Skt. Jørgens Gymnasium, where he was taught by the Hungarian mathematician Julius Pal during his first year. In 1925, Jessen graduated from the gymnasium and enrolled at the University of Copenhagen. During his time at the university he got to know Harald Bohr, then a leading figure in Danish mathematics. In 1928, Bohr established a collaboration with Jessen, which would last until Bohr's death in 1951.

After receiving his master's degree in the spring of 1929, Jessen embarked on a stay abroad. Supported by the Carlsberg Foundation, he spent the fall of 1929 at the University of Szeged, where he met Frigyes Riesz, Alfréd Haar, and Lipót Fejér. He then spent the winter semester of 1929–30 at the University of Göttingen, where he attended lectures by David Hilbert and Edmund Landau while working on his PhD thesis. On 1 May 1930 Jessen defended his thesis in Copenhagen. He later elaborated the thesis into an article that was published in Acta Mathematica in 1934. The same year, he was appointed as a docent at The Royal Veterinary and Agricultural University in Denmark.

In 1931, Jessen married Ellen Pedersen (1903–1979), cand. mag. in mathematics and the daughter of Peder Oluf Pedersen. Jessen continued to travel frequently in the early 1930s, visiting Paris, Cambridge, England, the Institute for Advanced Study, Yale and Harvard University in America.

== Career ==
Jessen was a professor of descriptive geometry at the Technical University of Denmark from 1935 till 1942, when he moved back to the University of Copenhagen where he was professor from 1942 to 1977 when he retired. He was the president of the Carlsberg Foundation in 1955-1963 and one of the founders of the Hans Christian Ørsted Institute. He was the Secretary of the Interim Executive Committee of the International Mathematical Union (1950–1952), and in September 1951 he officially declared the founding of the Union, with its first domicile in Copenhagen. He was also active in the Danish Mathematical Society. After his death, the society named an award in his honor (Børge Jessen Diploma Award).

== See also ==
- Jessen's icosahedron
- Jessen–Wintner theorem
