= Donald Sarason =

American mathematician (1933–2017)

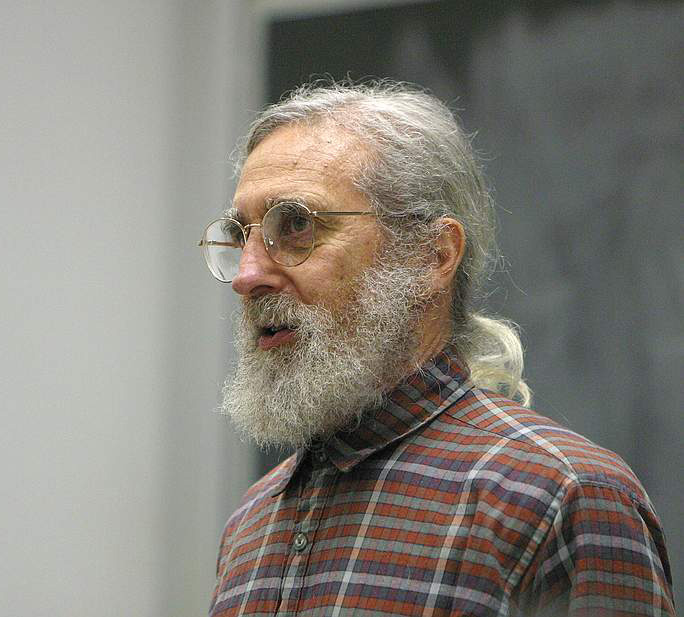
- Donald Sarason in January, 2003 at UC Berkeley
- Born: January 26, 1933; Detroit, Michigan, U.S.
- Died: April 8, 2017 (aged 84); Berkeley, California, U.S.
- Education: University of Michigan
- Known for: Hardy space theory and VMO
- Awards: Sloan Research Fellow, 1969–1971
- Scientific career
- Fields: Mathematics
- Workplaces: University of California, Berkeley
- Doctoral advisor: Paul Halmos
- Doctoral students: Sun-Yung Alice Chang; Sheldon Axler; Thomas Wolff; John Doyle; John McCarthy

Donald Erik Sarason (January 26, 1933 – April 8, 2017) was an American mathematician whose research topics included Hardy space theory and VMO. As a professor at the University of California, Berkeley he became the doctoral advisor of 39 graduate students.

== Education ==
Sarason majored in physics at the University of Michigan, graduating in 1955. After continuing for a master's degree in physics in 1957, he switched to mathematics, still at the University, completing his Ph.D. in 1963 under the supervision of Paul Halmos.

== Career ==
Sarason became a postdoctoral research at the Institute for Advanced Study in 1963–1964, supported by a National Science Foundation Postdoctoral Fellowship. He joined the University of California Berkeley as an assistant professor in 1964, was tenured as an associate professor in 1967, and promoted to full professor in 1970. He retired in 2012.

== Selected works ==
- 1967. Generalized Interpolation in $H^\infty$.
  Sarason reproved a theorem of G. Pick on when an interpolation problem can be solved by a holomorphic function that maps the disk to itself; this is often called Nevanlinna-Pick interpolation. Sarason’s approach not only gave a natural unification of the Pick interpolation problem with the Carathoédory interpolation problem (where the values of $\phi$ and its first $N-1$ derivatives at the origin are given), but it led to the Commutant Lifting theorem of Sz.-Nagy and Foiaş which inaugurated an operator theoretic approach to many problems in function theory.
- 1975. Functions of Vanishing Mean Oscillation.
  Sarason’s work played a major role in the modern development of function theory on the unit circle in the complex plane. In Sarason he showed that $H^\infty + C$ is a closed subalgebra of $L^\infty$. Sarason’s paper called attention to outstanding open questions concerning algebras of functions on the unit circle. Then in a 1975 paper, Sarason introduced the space VMO of functions of vanishing mean oscillation. A complex-valued function defined on the unit circle in the complex plane has vanishing mean oscillation if the average amount of the absolute value of its difference from its average over an interval has limit $0$ as the length of the interval shrinks to $0$. Thus VMO is a subspace of the set of functions with bounded mean oscillation, called BMO. Sarason proved that the set of bounded functions in VMO equals the set of functions in $H^\infty + C$ whose complex conjugates are in $H^\infty + C$. Extensions of these ideas led to a description of the closed subalgebras between $H^\infty$ and $L^\infty$ in Chang (written by one of Sarason’s former students) and Marshall.
- 1978. Function Theory on the Unit Circle. Notes for lectures at a conference at Virginia Polytechnic Institute and State University, Blacksburg, Virginia, June 19–23, 1978.
  On June 19–23, 1978, Sarason gave a series of ten lectures at a conference hosted by Virginia Polytechnic Institute and State University (now Virginia Tech) on analytic function theory on the unit circle. In these lectures he discussed a number of recent results in the field, bringing together classical ideas and more recent ideas from functional analysis and from the extension of the theory of Hardy spaces to higher dimensions. The lecture notes, entitled Function Theory on the Unit Circle were made available by the math department at VPI.
- 1994. Sub-Hardy Hilbert Spaces in the Unit Disk.
  This book developed the theory of the de Branges–Rovnyak spaces $\mathcal{H}(b)$, which were first introduced in de Branges and Rovnyak. Sarason pioneered the abstract treatment of contractive containment and established a fruitful connection between the spaces $\mathcal{H}(b)$ and the ranges of certain Toeplitz operators. Using reproducing kernel Hilbert space techniques, he gave elegant proofs of the Julia–Carathéodory and the Denjoy–Wolff theorems. Two recent accounts of the theory are Emmanuel Fricain and Javad Mashreghi and Dan Timotin.
- 2007. Complex Function Theory: Second Edition. The American Mathematical Society.
  This textbook for a first course in complex analysis at the advanced undergraduate level provides an introduction to the theory of analytic functions.
