= Kaplansky's conjectures =

Numerous conjectures by mathematician Irving Kaplansky

The mathematician Irving Kaplansky is notable for proposing numerous conjectures in several branches of mathematics, including a list of ten conjectures on Hopf algebras. They are usually known as Kaplansky's conjectures.

== Group rings ==
Let K be a field, and G a torsion-free group. Kaplansky's zero divisor conjecture states:

- The group ring K[G] does not contain nontrivial zero divisors, that is, it is a domain.

Two related conjectures are known as, respectively, Kaplansky's idempotent conjecture:

- K[G] does not contain any non-trivial idempotents, i.e., if a^{2} = a, then a = 1 or a = 0.

and Kaplansky's unit conjecture (which was originally made by Graham Higman and popularized by Kaplansky):

- K[G] does not contain any non-trivial units, i.e., if ab = 1 in K[G], then a = kg for some k in K and g in G.

The zero-divisor conjecture implies the idempotent conjecture and is implied by the unit conjecture. As of 2021, the zero divisor and idempotent conjectures are open. The unit conjecture, however, was disproved in characteristic 2 by Giles Gardam by exhibiting an explicit counterexample in a crystallographic group, namely the fundamental group of the Hantzsche–Wendt manifold; see also Fibonacci group. A later preprint by Gardam claims that essentially the same element also gives a counter-example in characteristic 0 (finding an inverse is computationally much more involved in this setting, hence the delay between the first result and the second one).

There are proofs of both the idempotent and zero-divisor conjectures for large classes of groups. For example, the zero-divisor conjecture is known for all elementary amenable groups (a class including all virtually solvable groups), since their group algebras are known to be Ore domains. It follows that the conjecture holds more generally for all residually torsion-free elementary amenable groups. Note that when $K$ is a field of characteristic zero, then the zero-divisor conjecture is implied by the Atiyah conjecture, which has also been established for large classes of groups.

The idempotent conjecture has a generalisation, the Kadison idempotent conjecture, also known as the Kadison–Kaplansky conjecture, for elements in the reduced group C*-algebra. In this setting, it is known that if the Farrell–Jones conjecture holds for K[G], then so does the idempotent conjecture. The latter has been positively solved for an extremely large class of groups, including for example all hyperbolic groups.

The unit conjecture is also known to hold in many groups, but its partial solutions are much less robust than the other two (as witnessed by the earlier-mentioned counter-example). This conjecture is not known to follow from any analytic statement like the other two, and so the cases where it is known to hold have all been established via a direct combinatorial approach involving the so-called unique products property. By Gardam's work mentioned above, it is now known to not be true in general.

== Banach algebras ==
This conjecture states that every algebra homomorphism from the Banach algebra C(X) (continuous complex-valued functions on X, where X is a compact Hausdorff space) into any other Banach algebra, is necessarily continuous. The conjecture is equivalent to the statement that every algebra norm on C(X) is equivalent to the usual uniform norm. (Kaplansky himself had earlier shown that every complete algebra norm on C(X) is equivalent to the uniform norm.)

In the mid-1970s, H. Garth Dales and J. Esterle independently proved that, if one furthermore assumes the validity of the continuum hypothesis, there exist compact Hausdorff spaces X and discontinuous homomorphisms from C(X) to some Banach algebra, giving counterexamples to the conjecture.

In 1976, R. M. Solovay (building on work of H. Woodin) exhibited a model of ZFC (Zermelo–Fraenkel set theory + axiom of choice) in which Kaplansky's conjecture is true. Kaplansky's conjecture is thus an example of a statement undecidable in ZFC.

== Quadratic forms ==
In 1953, Kaplansky proposed the conjecture that finite values of u-invariants can only be powers of 2.

In 1989, the conjecture was refuted by Alexander Merkurjev who demonstrated fields with u-invariants of any even m. In 1999, Oleg Izhboldin built a field with u-invariant m = 9 that was the first example of an odd u-invariant. In 2006, Alexander Vishik demonstrated fields with u-invariant $m=2^k+1$ for any integer k starting from 3.
