= Olga Korosteleva =

Russian-American statistician

Olga Korosteleva is a Russian-American statistician. She is a professor of statistics at California State University, Long Beach, and the author of several books on statistics.

== Education and career ==
Korosteleva grew up in the Soviet Union, but was educated in the US after her father, statistician Alexander Korostelev, became a professor at Wayne State University. She went to Wayne State herself as an undergraduate, completing a bachelor's degree there in 1996, and then earned a Ph.D. in statistics from Purdue University in 2002. Her dissertation, Limit theorem for the spread of branching process with stabilizing drift, was supervised by Thomas Sellke.

As well as holding a faculty position at California State University, Long Beach, Korosteleva has served as president of the Southern California Chapter of the American Statistical Association, and editor-in-chief of the chapter newsletter.

== Books ==
Korosteleva is the author or co-author of books including:

- Stochastic Processes with R: An Introduction, Chapman and Hall/CRC, 2022
- Advanced Regression Models with SAS and R, Chapman and Hall/CRC, 2018
- Nonparametric Methods in Statistics with SAS Applications, Chapman and Hall/CRC, 2013
- Mathematical Statistics: Asymptotic Minimax Theory (with Alexander Korostelev), American Mathematical Society, Graduate Studies in Mathematics, Volume 119, 2011
- Clinical Statistics: Introducing Clinical Trials, Survival Analysis, and Longitudinal Data Analysis, Jones and Bartlett Publishers, Inc, 2009
