= Ólafía Einarsdóttir =

Icelandic archaeologist and historian (1924-2017)

Dr Ólafía Einarsdóttir
- Born: 28 July 1924; Hafnarfjörður, Iceland
- Died: 19 December 2017 (aged 93); Copenhagen, Denmark
- Citizenship: Denmark
- Occupations: Archaeologist; Historian
- Spouse: Bent Fuglede

Academic background
- Education: University of London
- Alma mater: Lund University
- Thesis: Studier i kronologisk metode i tidlig islandsk historieskrivning (Studies in chronological method in early Icelandic historiography) (1964)
- Academic advisor: V Gordon Childe

Academic work
- Discipline: Viking Studies

Ólafía Einarsdóttir (28 July 1924 – 19 December 2017) was an Icelandic archaeologist and historian, specialising in Icelandic chronology. She was the first Icelander to complete a degree in archaeology. After completing her PhD from Lund University in 1964, she taught at the University of Copenhagen and published many works about Icelandic sagas and Viking history.

== Early life ==
Ólafía was born in Hafnafjördur, a suburb of Reykjavík, on 28 July 1924. Her parents were Einar Þorkelsson, Secretary General of the Althing, and Ólafía Guðmundsdóttir. One of six children, her mother died in childbirth when Ólafía was five; soon after her father became blind. She was then adopted by some friends of her mother's and raised by them. She was educated at Reykjavik High School and graduated from there in 1944.

== Career ==
Ólafía moved to London and began a degree in archaeology at the University of London, studying under V. Gordon Childe. She graduated in 1948 and became the first Icelandic person to earn a degree in archaeology.

After graduation she returned to Iceland and worked at the National Museum of Iceland, excavating pagan remains at the town of Brennistaði (is) in Eiðaþinghá (is). She then moved to Sweden to study for a MA in medieval history at Lund University, which she graduated from in 1951. She returned to work at National Museum of Iceland as a curator, but later resigned in protest at the conservative reforms the institution was making. Ólafía began her doctoral research at the Lund University where she examined Icelandic sagas as historical texts. She completed her PhD in 1964.

In 1963 she began work as an assistant professor at the University of Copenhagen and held the position until her retirement.

=== Research ===
Ólafía's research was concerned with the chronology and temporal structure of Icelandic saga literature. She recognised three different dating systems used by Ari in the Íslendingabók. She was also a proponent for an earlier timing for the conversion to Christianity in Iceland. Her research also encompassed the use of Latin by Icelandic writers, the cult of Guðmundr Arason, Archbishop Absalon, and many other subjects, including the role of women.

=== Honours ===
Ólafía was awarded an honorary doctorate by the Faculty of History and Philosophy at the University of Iceland in 2009.

=== Legacy ===
The journal Ólafía, published by the Icelandic Association of Archaeologists since 2013, is named after her.

== Personal life ==
Ólafía was married to Bent Fuglede, a mathematician, who she met whilst on a trip to Copenhagen, Denmark. Their son, Einar, was born in 1966. Ólafía died in Copenhagen on 19 December 2017.
