= John Robert Ringrose =

English mathematician

John Robert Ringrose (born 21 December 1932) is an English mathematician working on operator algebras who introduced nest algebras. He was elected a Fellow of the Royal Society in 1977. In 1962, Ringrose won the Adams Prize.

== Works ==
- (with Richard V. Kadison): Fundamentals of the Theory of Operator Algebras, 4 vols., Academic Press 1983, 1986, 1991, 1992 (2nd edn. American Mathematical Society 1997)
- Compact non self-adjoint operators, van Nostrand 1971

== See also ==
- Pisier–Ringrose inequality
