= Wiener–Wintner theorem =

In mathematics, the Wiener–Wintner theorem, named after Norbert Wiener and Aurel Wintner, is a strengthening of the ergodic theorem, proved by Wiener and Wintner (1941).

== Statement ==
Suppose that τ is a measure-preserving transformation of a measure space S with finite measure. If f is a real-valued integrable function on S then the Wiener–Wintner theorem states that there is a measure 0 set E such that the average

$$\lim_{\ell\rightarrow\infty}\frac{1}{2\ell+1}\sum_{j=-\ell}^\ell e^{ij\lambda} f(\tau^j P)$$

exists for all real λ and for all P not in E.

The special case for λ = 0 is essentially the Birkhoff ergodic theorem, from which the existence of a suitable measure 0 set E for any fixed λ, or any countable set of values λ, immediately follows. The point of the Wiener–Wintner theorem is that one can choose the measure 0 exceptional set E to be independent of λ.

This theorem was even much more generalized by the Return Times Theorem.
