= Kadison transitivity theorem =

In mathematics, Kadison transitivity theorem is a result in the theory of C*-algebras that, in effect, asserts the equivalence of the notions of topological irreducibility and algebraic irreducibility of representations of C*-algebras. It implies that, for irreducible representations of C*-algebras, the only non-zero linear invariant subspace is the whole space.

The theorem, proved by Richard Kadison, was surprising as a priori there is no reason to believe that all topologically irreducible representations are also algebraically irreducible.

== Statement ==
A family $\mathcal{F}$ of bounded operators on a Hilbert space $\mathcal{H}$ is said to act topologically irreducibly when $\{0\}$ and $\mathcal{H}$ are the only closed stable subspaces under $\mathcal{F}$. The family $\mathcal{F}$ is said to act algebraically irreducibly if $\{0\}$ and $\mathcal{H}$ are the only linear manifolds in $\mathcal{H}$ stable under $\mathcal{F}$.

Theorem. If the C*-algebra $\mathfrak{A}$ acts topologically irreducibly on the Hilbert space $\mathcal{H}, \{ y_1, \cdots, y_n \}$ is a set of vectors and $\{x_1, \cdots, x_n \}$ is a linearly independent set of vectors in $\mathcal{H}$, there is an $A$ in $\mathfrak{A}$ such that $Ax_j = y_j$. If $Bx_j = y_j$ for some self-adjoint operator $B$, then $A$ can be chosen to be self-adjoint.

Corollary. If the C*-algebra $\mathfrak{A}$ acts topologically irreducibly on the Hilbert space $\mathcal{H}$, then it acts algebraically irreducibly.
