= Barbara Kaltenbacher =

Austrian mathematician

Barbara Kaltenbacher is an Austrian mathematician whose research concerns inverse problems, regularization, and PDE-constrained optimization, with applications including the mathematical modeling of piezoelectricity and nonlinear acoustics. She is a professor of Applied Analysis at the University of Klagenfurt, a member of the executive committee of the European Mathematical Society and was editor in chief of the Journal of the European Mathematical Society.. Barbara Kaltenbacher has published more than 130 scientific papers and is (co-)author of four monographs.

== Education and career ==
Kaltenbacher studied mathematics at Johannes Kepler University Linz, earning a diploma in 1993 and a doctorate in 1996. Her dissertation, Some Newton type methods for the regularization of nonlinear ill-posed problems, was supervised by Heinz Engl. She was head of a Hertha Firnberg Project funded by the Austrian Science Fund FWF 1999-2001 and an Emmy Noether Junior Research group funded by the German Research Foundation DFG 2003–2006. After taking temporary professor positions at the University of Erlangen–Nuremberg, and the University of Göttingen, she became a professor of Optimization at the University of Stuttgart in 2006. She moved to the University of Graz in 2010 as a professor of Applied Mathematics, and to her present position in Klagenfurt in 2011. Barbara Kaltenbacher was president of the Austrian Mathematical Society, 2018–2021, chair of the scientific advisory board of the Weierstrass Institute, 2015–2021, and was elected as a corresponding member of the Austrian Academy of Sciences, in 2021.

== Books ==
Barbara Kaltenbacher is (co-)author of:

- Iterative Regularization Methods for Nonlinear Ill-Posed Problems (with Andreas Neubauer and Otmar Scherzer, de Gruyter, 2008)
- Regularization Methods in Banach Spaces (with Thomas Schuster, Bernd Hofmann, and Kamil S. Kazimierskide, Gruyter, 2012)
- Mathematical Theory of Evolutionary Fluid-Flow Structure Interactions (with Igor Kukavica, Irena Lasiecka, Roberto Triggiani, Amjad Tuffaha, and Justin T. Webster, Birkhäuser, 2018)
- Inverse Problems for Fractional Partial Differential Equations (with William Rundell). AMS, Graduate Studies in Mathematics, 2023
