= Erling Størmer =

Norwegian mathematician (born 1937)

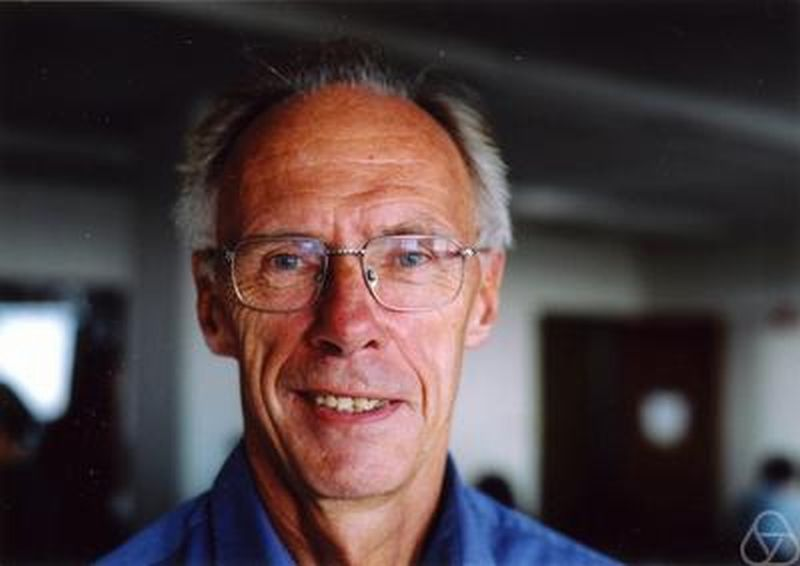
- Born: Erling Størmer; 2 November 1937 (age 88)
- Education: Columbia University
- Scientific career
- Fields: mathematics

Erling Størmer (born 2 November 1937) is a Norwegian mathematician, who has mostly worked with operator algebras.

He was born in Oslo as a son of Leif Størmer. He was a grandson of Carl Størmer and nephew of Per Størmer. He took his doctorate at Columbia University in 1963 with thesis advisor Richard Kadison, and was a professor at the University of Oslo from 1974 to his retirement in 2007.

He is a member of the Norwegian Academy of Science and Letters. In 2012 he became a fellow of the American Mathematical Society.

== See also ==
- Jordan operator algebra
