= Davar Khoshnevisan =

American mathematician

- Born: 21 July 1964 (age 62)
- Education: University of California, Berkeley
- Occupation: Mathematician

Davar Khoshnevisan (born 21 July 1964) is an American mathematician.

== Biography ==
Khoshnevisan completed bachelor's and master's degrees in mathematical sciences at Johns Hopkins University and a doctorate at the University of California, Berkeley, advised by Warry Millar. Khoshnevisan began his teaching career at the Massachusetts Institute of Technology. After one year, he joined the University of Wisconsin–Madison faculty. In 1993, Khoshnevisan moved to the University of Utah. Khoshnevisan was elected a fellow of the Institute of Mathematical Statistics in 2015, and awarded an equivalent honor by the American Mathematical Society in 2020.
