= Fuglede−Kadison determinant =

In mathematics, the Fuglede−Kadison determinant of an invertible operator in a finite factor is a positive real number associated with it. It defines a multiplicative homomorphism from the set of invertible operators to the set of positive real numbers. The Fuglede−Kadison determinant of an operator $A$ is often denoted by $\Delta(A)$.

For a matrix $A$ in $M_n(\mathbb{C})$, $\Delta(A) = \left| \det(A) \right|^{1/n}$ which is the normalized form of the absolute value of the determinant of $A$.

== Definition ==
Let $\mathcal{M}$ be a finite factor with the canonical normalized trace $\tau$ and let $X$ be an invertible operator in $\mathcal{M}$. Then the Fuglede−Kadison determinant of $X$ is defined as

$$\Delta(X) := \exp \tau(\log (X^*X)^{1/2}),$$

(cf. Relation between determinant and trace via eigenvalues). The number $\Delta(X)$ is well-defined by continuous functional calculus.

== Properties ==
- $\Delta(XY) = \Delta(X) \Delta(Y)$ for invertible operators $X, Y \in \mathcal{M}$,
- $\Delta (\exp A) = \left| \exp \tau(A) \right| = \exp \Re \tau(A)$ for $A \in \mathcal{M}.$
- $\Delta$ is norm-continuous on $GL_1(\mathcal{M})$, the set of invertible operators in $\mathcal{M},$
- $\Delta(X)$ does not exceed the spectral radius of $X$.

== Extensions to singular operators ==
There are many possible extensions of the Fuglede−Kadison determinant to singular operators in $\mathcal{M}$. All of them must assign a value of 0 to operators with non-trivial nullspace. No extension of the determinant $\Delta$ from the invertible operators to all operators in $\mathcal{M}$ is continuous in the uniform topology.

=== Algebraic extension ===
The algebraic extension of $\Delta$ assigns a value of 0 to a singular operator in $\mathcal{M}$.

=== Analytic extension ===
For an operator $A$ in $\mathcal{M}$, the analytic extension of $\Delta$ uses the spectral decomposition of $|A| = \int \lambda \; dE_\lambda$ to define $\Delta(A) := \exp \left( \int \log \lambda \; d\tau(E_\lambda) \right)$ with the understanding that $\Delta(A) = 0$ if $\int \log \lambda \; d\tau(E_\lambda) = -\infty$. This extension satisfies the continuity property

$\lim_{\varepsilon \rightarrow 0} \Delta(H + \varepsilon I) = \Delta(H)$ for $H \ge 0.$

== Generalizations ==
Although originally the Fuglede−Kadison determinant was defined for operators in finite factors, it carries over to the case of operators in von Neumann algebras with a tracial state ($\tau$), in which case it is denoted by $\Delta_\tau(\cdot)$.
