= Spectral set =

Subset of complex numbers

In operator theory, a set $X\subseteq\mathbb{C}$ is said to be a spectral set for a (possibly unbounded) linear operator $T$ on a Banach space if the spectrum of $T$ is in $X$ and von-Neumann's inequality holds for $T$ on $X$ - i.e. for all rational functions $r(x)$ with no poles on $X$

$$\left\Vert r(T) \right\Vert \leq \left\Vert r \right\Vert_{X} = \sup \left\{\left\vert r(x) \right\vert : x\in X \right\}$$

This concept is related to the topic of analytic functional calculus of operators. In general, one wants to get more details about the operators constructed from functions with the original operator as the variable.

For a detailed discussion of spectral sets and von Neumann's inequality, see.
