= Neumann–Poincaré operator =

Non-self-adjoint compact operator used to solve boundary value problems for the Laplacian

In mathematics, the Neumann–Poincaré operator or Poincaré–Neumann operator, named after Carl Neumann and Henri Poincaré, is a non-self-adjoint compact operator introduced by Poincaré to solve boundary value problems for the Laplacian on bounded domains in Euclidean space. Within the language of potential theory it reduces the partial differential equation to an integral equation on the boundary to which the theory of Fredholm operators can be applied. The theory is particularly simple in two dimensions—the case treated in detail in this article—where it is related to complex function theory, the conjugate Beurling transform or complex Hilbert transform and the Fredholm eigenvalues of bounded planar domains.

== Dirichlet and Neumann problems ==
Green's theorem for a bounded region Ω in the plane with smooth boundary ∂Ω states that

$$\displaystyle{\int_{\partial\Omega} A\, dx + B\, dy =\iint_\Omega (B_x-A_y)\, dx\, dy.}$$

One direct way to prove this is as follows. By subtraction, it is sufficient to prove the theorem for a region bounded by a simple smooth curve. Any such is diffeomorphic to the closed unit disk. By change of variables it is enough to prove the result there. Separating the A and B terms, the right hand side can be written as a double integral starting in the x or y direction, to which the fundamental theorem of calculus can be applied. This converts the integral over the disk into the integral over its boundary.

Let Ω be a region bounded by a simple closed curve. Given a smooth function f on the closure of Ω its normal derivative ∂_{n}f at a boundary point is the directional derivative in the direction of the outward pointing normal vector. Applying Green's theorem with A = v_{x} u and B = v_{y} u gives the first of Green's identities:

$$\displaystyle{\int_{\partial\Omega} u \, \partial_nv = \iint_\Omega u_x v_x + u_y v_y - u \, \Delta v,}$$

where the Laplacian Δ is given by

$$\displaystyle \Delta  = -\partial^2_x -\partial_y^2.$$

Swapping u and v and subtracting gives the second of Green's identities:

$$\displaystyle{\int_{\partial\Omega} u \,   \partial_nv - \partial_nu \, v=\iint_\Omega \, \Delta u \, v - u \, \Delta v.}$$

If now u is harmonic in Ω and v = 1, then this identity implies that

$$\displaystyle{\int_{\partial\Omega} \partial_n u = 0,}$$

so the integral of the normal derivative of a harmonic function on the boundary of a region always vanishes.

A similar argument shows that the average of a harmonic function on the boundary of a disk equals its value at the centre. Translating the disk can be taken to be centred at 0. Green's identity can be applied to an annulus formed of the boundary of the disk and a small circle centred on 0 with v = z^{2}: it follows that the average is independent of the circle. It tends to the value at its value at 0 as the radius of the smaller circle decreases. This result also follows easily using Fourier series and the Poisson integral.

For continuous functions f on the whole plane which are smooth in Ω and the complementary region Ω^{c}, the first derivative can have a jump across the boundary of Ω. The value of the normal derivative at a boundary point can be computed from inside or outside Ω. The interior normal derivative will be denoted by ∂_{n−} and the exterior normal derivative by ∂_{n+}. With this terminology the four basic problems of classical potential theory are as follows:

- Interior Dirichlet problem: ∆u = 0 in Ω, u = f on ∂Ω
- Interior Neumann problem: ∆u = 0 in Ω, ∂_{n−} u = f on ∂Ω
- Exterior Dirichlet problem: ∆u = 0 in Ω^{c}, u = f on ∂Ω, u continuous at ∞
- Exterior Neumann problem: ∆u = 0 in Ω^{c}, ∂_{n+} u = f on ∂Ω, u continuous at ∞

For the exterior problems the inversion map z^{−1} takes harmonic functions on Ω^{c} into harmonic functions on the image of Ω^{c} under the inversion map. The transform v of u is continuous in a small disc |z| ≤ r and harmonic everywhere in the interior except possibly 0. Let w be the harmonic function given by the Poisson integral on |z| ≤ r with the same boundary value g as v on |z| = r. Applying the maximum principle to v − w + ε log |z| on δ ≤ |z| ≤ r, it must be negative for δ small. Hence v(z) ≤ u(z) for z ≠ 0. The same argument applies with v and w swapped, so v = w is harmonic in the disk. Thus the singularity at ∞ is removable.

By the maximum principle the interior and exterior Dirichlet problems have unique solutions. For the interior Neumann problem, if a solution u is harmonic in 0 and its interior normal derivative vanishes, then Green's first identity implies the u_{x} = 0 = u_{y}, so that u is constant. This shows the interior Neumann problem has a unique solution up to adding constants. Applying inversion, the same holds for the external Neumann problem.

For both Neumann problems, a necessary condition for a solution to exist is

$$\displaystyle{\int_{\partial\Omega} f\,\,=\,\,0.}$$

For the interior Neumann problem, this follows by setting v = 1 in Green's second identity. For the exterior Neumann problem, the same can be done for the intersection of Ω^{c} and a large disk |z| < R, giving

$$\displaystyle{\int_{\partial\Omega} f\,\,=\,\,\int_{|z|=R}\partial_n u.}$$

At ∞ u is the real part of a holomorphic function F with

$$\displaystyle{F(z)=a_0 + a_1z^{-1} + a_2 z^{-2} + \cdots}$$

The interior normal derivative on |z| = R is just the radial derivative ∂_{r}, so that for |z| = R

$$\displaystyle{|\partial_r F(z)| = |F^\prime(z)|\le C R^{-2}.}$$

Hence

$$\displaystyle{\left|\int_{|z|=R}\partial_n u\right|\le 2\pi CR^{-1},}$$

so the integral over ∂Ω must vanish.

The fundamental solution of the Laplacian is given by

$$\displaystyle{E(z) =-{1\over 2\pi} \log |z|.}$$

N(z) = − E(z) is called the Newtonian potential in the plane. Using polar coordinates, it is easy to see that E is in L^{p} on any closed disk for any finite p ≥ 1. To say that E is a fundamental solution of the Laplacian means that for any smooth function φ of compact support

$$\displaystyle{\iint E \cdot\Delta\varphi = \varphi(0).}$$

The standard proof uses Green's second identity on the annulus r ≤ |z| ≤ R where the support of φ is contained in |z| < R. In fact, since E is harmonic away from 0,

$$\displaystyle{\iint_{|z|\ge r} E \cdot \Delta \varphi  ={1\over 2\pi}\int_0^{2\pi} \varphi(r e^{i\theta})  - r \cdot \log r\cdot\partial_n\varphi(re^{i\theta})  \, d\theta.}$$

As r tends to zero, the first term on the right hand side tends to φ(0) and the second to 0, since r log r tends to 0 and the normal derivatives of φ are uniformly bounded. (That both sides are equal even before taking limits follows from the fact that the average of a harmonic function on the boundary of a disk equals it value at the centre, while the integral of its normal derivative vanishes.)

== Neumann–Poincaré kernel ==
The properties of the fundamental solution lead to the following formula for recovering a harmonic function u in Ω from its boundary values:

$$\displaystyle{u(z)=\int_{\partial \Omega} K(z,w)u(w) - N(z-w)\partial_n u(w) \,|dw|,}$$

where K is the Neumann−Poincaré kernel

$$\displaystyle{K(z,w)=\partial_{n,w} N(z-w).}$$

To prove this identity, Green's second identity can be applied to Ω with a small disk centred on z removed. This reduces to showing that the identity holds in the limit for a small disk centred on z shrinking in size. Translating, it can be assumed that z = 0 and the identity becomes

$$\displaystyle{u(0)=\lim_{r\rightarrow 0} {1\over 2\pi}\int_{0}^{2\pi} u(re^{i\theta}) - r\cdot \log r \cdot \partial_r u(re^{i\theta})\,d\theta,}$$

which was proved above. A similar formula holds for functions harmonic in Ω^{c}:

$$\displaystyle{u(z)=\int_{\partial \Omega} -K(z,w)u(w) + N(z-w)\partial_n u(w) \,|dw|.}$$

The signs are reversed because of the direction of the normal derivative.

In two dimensions the Neumann–Poincaré kernel K(z,w) has the remarkable property that it restricts to a smooth function on ∂Ω × ∂Ω. It is a priori only defined as a smooth function off the diagonal but it admit a (unique) smooth extension to the diagonal. Using vector notation v(t) = (x(t), y(t)) to parametrize the boundary curve by arc length, the following classical formulas hold:

$$\displaystyle{\dot{\mathbf{v}}\cdot \dot{\mathbf{v}} =1,\,\,\, \ddot{\mathbf{v}}\cdot \dot{\mathbf{v}} = 0.}$$

Thus the unit tangent vector t(t) at t is the velocity vector

$$\displaystyle{\mathbf{t} =\dot{\mathbf{v}},}$$

so the oriented unit normal n(t) is

$$\displaystyle{\mathbf{n}=(-\dot{y},\dot{x}).}$$

The constant relating the acceleration vector to the normal vector is the curvature of the curve:

$$\displaystyle{\ddot{\mathbf{v}}=\kappa(t)\,\mathbf{n}(t).}$$

Thus the curvature is given by

$$\displaystyle{\kappa=\ddot{\mathbf{v}}\cdot \mathbf{n}=\ddot{y}\dot {x} - \ddot{x}\dot{y}.}$$

There are two further formulas of Frenet:

$$\displaystyle{\dot{\mathbf{n}}=-\kappa \mathbf{t},\,\,\, \ddot{\mathbf{n}}= \dot{\kappa}\mathbf{n} -\kappa^2 \mathbf{t}.}$$

The Neumann–Poincaré kernel is given by the formula

$$\displaystyle{K(\mathbf{u},\mathbf{v}(t))=-{1\over 2\pi} {(\mathbf{u}-\mathbf{v}(t))\cdot\mathbf{n}(t)\over |\mathbf{u}-\mathbf{v}|^2}.}$$

For s ≠ t, set

$$\displaystyle{k(s,t)=K(v(s),v(t)).}$$

The function

$$\displaystyle{a(s,t)={|v(s)-v(t)|^2\over |e^{is/L} -e^{it/L}|^2}}$$

is smooth and nowhere vanishing with a(s,s) = L^{2} if the length of the curve is 2πL.

Similarly the function

$$\displaystyle{b(s,t)=  {(\mathbf{v}(s)-\mathbf{v}(t))\cdot\mathbf{n}(t)\over |e^{is/L} -e^{it/L}|^2}}$$

is smooth. In fact writing s = t + h,

$$\displaystyle{\mathbf{v}(t+h)-\mathbf{v}(t)=h \mathbf{t}(t) + {h^2\over 2} \kappa(t) \mathbf{n}(t) -{h^3\over 6} \kappa(t)\mathbf{t}(t) + {h^4 \over 24}(\dot{\kappa}\mathbf{n} -\kappa^2 \mathbf{t}) + \cdots , }$$

so that

$$\displaystyle{h^{-2}(\mathbf{v}(t+h)-\mathbf{v}(t))\cdot\mathbf{n}(t)=\kappa(t)/2  +h^2 \dot{\kappa}(t)/24 +\cdots}$$

On the diagonal b(t,t) = κ L^{2} / 2. Since k is proportional to b / a, it is also smooth. Its diagonal values are given by the formula

$$\displaystyle{k(t,t)=-{\kappa(t)\over 4\pi}.}$$

Another expression for k(s,t) is as follows:

$$\displaystyle{k(s,t)={1\over 2\pi}\partial_t \arg (z(s) - z(t)),}$$

where z(t) = x(t) + i y(t) is the boundary curve parametrized by arc length. This follows from the identity

$$\displaystyle{\log z = \log |z| + i\arg z}$$

and the Cauchy–Riemann equations which can be used to express the normal derivative in terms of the tangential derivative, and

$$\displaystyle{K(\mathbf{v}(t)+ \lambda \mathbf{n}(t),\mathbf{v}(t))=-{1\over 2\pi \lambda},}$$

so in the direction normal to the boundary curve K is discontinuous at the boundary.

== Double layer potentials ==
The double layer potential with moment φ in C(∂Ω) is defined on the complement of ∂Ω as

$$\displaystyle{D(\varphi)(z)= \int_{\partial\Omega} K(z,w)\varphi(w)\, |dw|.}$$

It is a continuous function on the complement. Since the restriction of K extends to a smooth function on ∂Ω × ∂Ω, D(φ) can also be defined on ∂Ω. However like the Neumann–Poincaré kernel it will have discontinuities at the boundary. These are jump discontinuities. If φ is real, then the double layer potential is just the real part of a Cauchy integral:

$$\displaystyle{D(\varphi)(z)= \Re {1\over 2\pi i} \int_{\partial\Omega} {\varphi(w)\over w-z}\,dw .}$$

The simplest case is when φ is identically 1 on ∂Ω. In this case D(1) equals

- 1 on Ω, by the vanishing of the integral of the normal derivative on the boundary region bounded by ∂Ω and a small disk centred on z; so the integral over the ∂Ω equals the average of the function 1 on the boundary of small disk and hence equals 1. (This integral and the one for Ω^{c} can also be calculated using Cauchy's integral theorem.)
- 0 on Ω^{c}, because it is the integral of a normal derivative of a harmonic function.
- 1/2 on ∂Ω, since

$$\displaystyle{\int_{\partial\Omega} K(z,w) |dw| ={1\over 2\pi}\int_{s-\pi L}^{s+\pi L} \partial_t \arg (z(s) - z(t))\, dt =1/2.}$$

By definition the Neumann–Poincaré operator T_{K} is the operator on L^{2}(∂Ω) given by the kernel K(z,w). It is a Hilbert–Schmidt operator since the kernel is continuous. It takes values in C^{∞}(∂Ω) since the kernel is smooth. The third computation above is equivalent to the statement that the constant function 1 is an eigenfunction of T_{K} with eigenvalue 1/2.

To establish jump formulas for more general functions, it is necessary to check that the integrals for D(1) are uniformly absolutely convergent, i.e. that there is a uniform finite bound C such that

$$\displaystyle{\int_{\partial \Omega} |K(z,w)|\, |dw| \le C}$$

for all z not in the boundary. It is enough to check this for points in a tubular neighbourhood of the boundary. Any such point u lies on a normal through a unique point, v(0) say, on the curve and it is enough to look at the contribution to the integral from points v(t) with t in a small interval around 0. Writing

$$\displaystyle{\mathbf{u}=\mathbf{v}(0) + \lambda \mathbf{n}(0),}$$

it follows that

$$\displaystyle{\mathbf{v}(t)-\mathbf{u}= -\lambda\mathbf{n}(0) + t\mathbf{t}(0) + {t^2 \over 2}\kappa(0)\mathbf{n}(0) + O(t^3).}$$

So for t sufficiently small

$$\displaystyle{|\mathbf{v}(t)-\mathbf{u}|^2 = \lambda^2 + t^2(1-\lambda\kappa(0)) + O(t^3)\ge (\lambda^2 + t^2)/2,\,\,\, \,\,\,|(\mathbf{v}(t)-\mathbf{u})\cdot \mathbf{n}(0)| =|-\lambda + {t^2 \over 2}\kappa(0) +  O(t^3)|\le |\lambda| + C_1t^2}$$

for some constant C_{1}. (The first inequality gives an approximate version of Pythagoras' theorem in the tubular neighbourhood.) Hence

$$\displaystyle{2\pi\cdot |K(\mathbf{u},\mathbf{v}(t))|={|(\mathbf{v}(t)-\mathbf{u})\cdot \mathbf{n}(0)|\over |\mathbf{v}(t)-\mathbf{u}|^2} \le {2|\lambda| + C_1t^2\over \lambda^2 + t^2}\le {2|\lambda|\over \lambda^2 + t^2} +C_1.}$$

Uniform boundedness follows because the first term has a finite integral independent of λ:

$$\displaystyle{\int_{-\infty}^\infty {|\lambda|\, dt\over t^2 + \lambda^2} = \int_{-\infty}^\infty {dt\over t^2 + 1}=\pi<\infty.}$$

The bound above can be used to prove that if the moment φ vanishes at a boundary point z then its double layer potential D(φ) is continuous at z. More generally if φ_{n} tends uniformly to φ, then D(φ_{n})(z_{n}) converges to D(φ)(z). In fact suppose that |φ(w)| ≤ ε if |w - z| ≤ δ. Taking z_{n} tending to z

$|D(\varphi_n)(z_n) - D(\varphi)(z)| \le \int_{|w-z|\ge\delta} |K(z_n,w)-K(z,w)||\varphi(w)|\,|dw| +\int_{|w-z|\le\delta} (|K(z_n,w)|+|K(z,w)|)\cdot|\varphi(w)| \, |dw|$

$$+ \int_{\partial \Omega} |K(z_n,w)|\cdot |\varphi_n(w) -\varphi(w)|\, |dw|.$$

The first integrand tends uniformly to 0 so the integral tends to 0. The second integral is bounded above by 2εC. The third integral is bounded by C times the supremum norm of φ_{n} − φ. Hence D(φ)(z_{n}) tends to D(φ)(z).

JUMP FORMULAS. If φ is a continuous function on ∂Ω, the restrictions of its double layer potential u = Dφ to Ω and Ω^{c} extend uniquely to continuous functions on their closures. Let u_{−} and u_{+} be the resulting continuous functions on ∂Ω. Then

$$\displaystyle{u_-(z) = {1\over 2}\varphi(z) + T_K\varphi(z),\,\,\,\,\,  u_+(z) = -{1\over 2}\varphi(z) + T_K\varphi(z).}$$

In particular

$$\displaystyle{\varphi=u_- - u_+.}$$

In fact the expressions for u_{±} are continuous, so it is enough to show that the if z_{n} tends to a boundary point z with z_{n} in Ω or Ω^{c} then u(z_{n}) tends to the expression for u_{±}(z). If z_{n} lie in Ω or Ω^{c} then

$$\displaystyle{u(z_n) \mp {1\over 2}\varphi(z) - T_K\varphi(z)=\int_{\partial \Omega} (K(z_n,w) -K(z,w))(\varphi(w)-\varphi(z))\,|dw| = D(\psi)(z_n) - D(\psi)(z),}$$

where ψ(w) = φ(w) − φ(z). The right hand side tends to zero since ψ vanishes at z.

== Single layer potentials ==
The single layer potential with moment φ in C(∂Ω) is defined on C as

$$\displaystyle{S(\varphi)(z)=\int_{\partial\Omega} N(z-w)\varphi(w)\,|dw|,}$$

where N is the Newtonian potential

$$\displaystyle{N(z)={1\over 2 \pi} \log |z|.}$$

The single layer potential is harmonic off ∂Ω. Since

$$\displaystyle{S(\varphi)(z)={1\over 2\pi}\int_{\partial} (\log |z-w| - \log |z|) \varphi(w)\,|dw| + {\log |z| \over 2\pi} \int \varphi(w) \, |dw|,}$$

and the first integrand tends uniformly to 0 as |z| tends to infinity, the single layer potential is harmonic at infinity if and only if ∫ φ = 0.

The single layer potential is continuous on C. In fact continuity off ∂Ω is clear. If z_{n} tends to z with z in ∂Ω, then

$$|S(\varphi)(z)-S(\varphi)(z_n)| \le{1\over 2\pi}\int_{|w-z|\ge \varepsilon} |\log |z-w| -\log |z_n-w||\,|\varphi(w)|\, |dw| + \|\varphi\|_\infty \int_{|w-z|\le \varepsilon} (|\log|z-w|| + |\log|z_n-w||)\, |dw|.$$

The first integrand tends uniformly to 0 on |w - z| ≥ ε. For n sufficiently large the last integral is bounded by

$$\displaystyle{2\int_{|w-z|\le 2\varepsilon} |\log|z-w|| \,\, |dw|,}$$

which tends to 0 as ε tends to 0, by the Cauchy–Schwarz inequality since the integrand is square integrable.

The same argument shows that S = T_{N} defines a bounded operator on C(∂Ω):

$$\displaystyle{\|S\varphi\|_\infty \le C^\prime \|\varphi\|_\infty,}$$

for φ in C(∂Ω).

Although the single layer potentials are continuous, their first derivatives have a jump discontinuity across ∂Ω. On the tubular neighbourhood of ∂Ω, the normal derivative is defined by

$$\displaystyle{\partial_n u(z + a\mathbf{n}_z)={d\over dt} a(z+t\mathbf{n}_z)|_{t=a}.}$$

It follows that

$$\displaystyle{\partial_n S(\varphi)(z)=\int_{\partial\Omega} K(w,z) \varphi(w)\,|dw|,}$$

so it is given by the adjoint kernel of K:

$$\displaystyle{K^*(z,w)=K(w,z).}$$

The kernel K* extends naturally to a smooth function on ∂Ω × ∂Ω and the operator T_{K*} is the adjoint of T_{K} on L^{2}(∂Ω).

JUMP FORMULAS. If φ is a continuous function on ∂Ω, the normal derivatives of the single layer potential u = S(φ) on Ω and Ω^{c} near ∂Ω extend continuously to the closure of both regions, defining continuous functions ∂_{n-} u and ∂_{n+} u on ∂Ω. Then

$$\displaystyle{\partial_{n-}u(z) = -{1\over 2}\varphi(z) + T_K^*\varphi(z),\,\,\,\,\,  \partial_{n+}u(z) = {1\over 2}\varphi(z) + T_K^*\varphi(z).}$$

In particular

$$\displaystyle{\varphi=\partial_{n+}u - \partial_{n-}u.}$$

In fact let v = D(φ) be the double layer potential with moment φ. On ∂Ω set

$$\displaystyle{f=T_K\varphi + T_K^*\varphi}$$

and on the complement of ∂Ω in a tubular neighbourhood set

$$\displaystyle{f=v +\partial_n u.}$$

Then f is continuous on the tubular neighbourhood. In fact, by definition is continuous on ∂Ω and its complement, so it suffices to that f(z_{n}) tends to f(z) whenever z_{n} is a sequence of points in the complement tending to a boundary point z. In this case

$$\displaystyle{f(z_n)-f(z)=\int_{\partial\Omega} (K(w,z_n) + K(z_n,w) - K(w,z) - K(z,w))\varphi(w) \, |dw| =\int_{|w-z|\ge \delta} + \int_{|w-z|\le \delta}.}$$

The integrand tends uniformly to 0 for |w − z| ≥ δ, so the first integral tends to 0. To show the second integral is small for δ small, it suffices to show that the integrand is uniformly bounded. This follows because, if ζ_{n} is the point on ∂Ω with normal containing z_{n}, then

$$\displaystyle{2\pi|K(z_n,w)+K(w,z_n)| ={|(z_n-w)\cdot (\mathbf{n}_{\zeta_n} -\mathbf{n}_w)|\over  |z_n-w|^2}\le {|\mathbf{n}_{\zeta_n} -\mathbf{n}_w|\over |z_n-w|}={|\mathbf{n}_{\zeta_n} -\mathbf{n}_w|\over |\zeta_n-w|}\cdot {|\zeta_n -w|\over |z_n-w|}.}$$

The first term the last product uniformly bounded because of the smoothness of the Gauss map n(t). The second is uniformly bounded because of the approximate version of Pythagoras' theorem:

$$\displaystyle{|z_n -w|^2 \ge (|z_n-\zeta_n|^2 + |\zeta_n -w|^2)/2.}$$

Continuity of f implies that on ∂Ω

$$\displaystyle{T_K\varphi + T^*_K\varphi= v_\pm +\partial_{n\pm}u=\mp\varphi/2 +T_K\varphi +\partial_{n\pm}u,}$$

which gives the jump formulas.

== Derivatives of layer potentials ==
If the moment φ is smooth, the derivatives of the single and double layer potentials on Ω and Ω^{c} extend continuously to their closures.

As usual the gradient of a function f defined on an open set in R^{2} is defined by

$$\displaystyle{\nabla f=(\partial_xf,\partial_yf).}$$

Set

$$\displaystyle{\widetilde{\nabla} f=(\partial_yf, -\partial_xf).}$$

If the moment φ is smooth, then

$$\displaystyle{\nabla S(\varphi) = -D(\varphi \mathbf{n}) + S(\partial_t (\varphi \mathbf{t})),\,\,\,
\nabla D(\varphi)=\widetilde{\nabla} S(\dot{\varphi}).}$$

In fact

$$\displaystyle{\nabla_z N(z-w)=-\nabla_wN(z-w) =-\partial_{n,w}N(z-w)\mathbf{n}_w -\partial_tN(z-w)\mathbf{t}_w,}$$

so that

$$\displaystyle{\nabla S(\varphi)= -D(\varphi \mathbf{n})-\int_{\partial\Omega} (\partial_{t}N(z-\mathbf{v}(t))) \varphi(t)\mathbf{t}(t)\, dt= -D(\varphi \mathbf{n})+ S(\partial_t (\varphi \mathbf{t})).}$$

Moreover

$$\displaystyle{\nabla D(\varphi) = \int_{\partial\Omega} \Delta_z N(z-w)\mathbf{n}\varphi -\widetilde{\nabla}\int_{\partial\Omega} \partial_{t}N(z-\mathbf{v}(t))\,\varphi \, dt=\widetilde{\nabla} S(\dot{\varphi}).}$$

The second relation can be rewritten by substituting in from the first relation:

$$\displaystyle{\nabla D(\varphi)=D(\dot{\varphi}\mathbf{t}) + S(\partial_t(\dot{\varphi}\mathbf{n})),}$$

Regularity of layer potentials. As a consequence of these relations, successive derivatives can all be expressed in terms of single and double layer potentials of smooth moments on the boundary. Since the layer potentials on Ω and Ω^{c} have continuous limits on the boundary it follows that they define smooth functions on the closures of Ω and Ω^{c}.

Continuity of normal derivatives of double layer potentials. Just as the single layer potentials are continuous at the boundary with a jump in the normal derivative, so the double layer potentials have a jump across the boundary while their normal derivatives are continuous. In fact from the formula above

$$\displaystyle{\partial_n D(\varphi)(\mathbf{v}(s) +\lambda \mathbf{n}(s))= D(\dot{\varphi}\mathbf{t}\cdot \mathbf{n}(s))+ S(\partial_t(\dot{\varphi}\mathbf{n})\cdot\mathbf{n}(s)).}$$

If s_{n} tends to s and λ_{n} tends to 0, the first term tends to T_{K}(v(s)) since the moments tend uniformly to a moment vanishing at t = s; the second term is continuous because it is a single layer potential.

== Solution of Dirichlet and Neumann problems ==
The following properties of T = T_{K} are required to solve the boundary value problem:

- 1/2 is not a generalized eigenvalue of T_{K} or T_{K}*; it has multiplicity one.
- −1/2 is not an eigenvalue of T_{K} or T_{K}*.

In fact since a I + T is a Fredholm operator of index 0, it and its adjoint have kernels of equal dimension. The same applies to any power of this operator. So it suffices to verify each of the statements for either T or T*. To check that T has no generalized eigenvectors with eigenvalue 1/2 it suffices to show that

$$\displaystyle{T_K\varphi -{1\over 2}\varphi = 1}$$

has no solutions. The definition of the double layer potential shows that it vanishes at ∞, so that it is harmonic at ∞. The equation above shows that if u = D(φ) then u_{+} = 1. On the other hand, applying the inversion map gives a contradiction; for it would produce a harmonic map in bounded region vanishing at an interior point with boundary value 1, which contradicts the fact that 1 is the only harmonic map with boundary value 1. If the eigenvalue 1/2 has multiplicity greater than 1, there is a moment φ such that T*φ = φ/2 and ∫ φ = 0. It follows that if u = S(φ) then ∂_{n−} u = 0. By uniqueness u is constant on Ω. Since u is continuous on R^{2} ∪ ∞ and is harmonic at ∞ (since ∫ φ = 0) and constant on ∂Ω, it must be zero. Hence φ = ∂_{n+} u − ∂_{n−} u = 0. Thus the eigenspace is one-dimensional and the eigenfunction ψ can be normalized so that S(ψ) = 1 on ∂Ω.

In general if

$$\displaystyle{T_K^*\varphi +{1\over 2}\varphi = f,}$$

then

$$\displaystyle{\int \varphi =\int f,}$$

since

$$\int f=(f,1)=((T_K^* +{1\over 2})\varphi,1)=(\varphi,(T_K + {1\over 2})1)=(\varphi,1)=\int \varphi.$$

If φ satisfies

$$\displaystyle{T_K^*\varphi +{1\over 2}\varphi = 0,}$$

it follows that ∫ φ = 0 and so u = S(φ) is harmonic at infinity. By the jump formulas, ∂_{n-}u = 0. By uniqueness u is constant on Ω. By continuity it is constant on ∂Ω. Since it is harmonic on Ω^{c} and vanishes at infinity, it must vanish identically. As above this forces φ = 0.

These results on the eigenvalues of T_{K} lead to the following conclusions about the four boundary value problems:

- there is always a unique solution to the interior and exterior Dirichlet problems;
- there is a solution to the interior and exterior Neumann problems if and only if ∫ f = 0; the solution is unique up to a constant for the interior Neumann problem and unique for the exterior problem;
- the solution is smooth on the closure of the domain if the boundary data is smooth.

The solution is obtained as follows:

- Interior Dirichlet problem. Let φ be the unique solution of T_{K}φ + φ/2 = f. Then u = D(φ) gives the solution of the Dirichlet problem in Ω by the jump formula.
- Exterior Dirichlet problem. Since 1 is not in the range of T_{K} − ½I, f can be written uniquely as f = T_{K}φ − φ/2 + λ where φ is unique up to a constant. Then u = D(φ) + λS(ψ) gives the solution of the Dirichlet problem in Ω^{c} by the jump formula.
- Interior Neumann problem. The condition (f,1) = 0 implies that f = T_{K}*φ − φ/2 can be solved. Then u = S(φ) gives the solution of the Neumann problem in Ω by the jump formula.
- Exterior Neumann problem. Let φ be the unique solution of T_{K}*φ + φ/2 = f. Then u = S(φ) gives the solution of the Neumann problem in Ω by the jump formula.

The smoothness of the solution follows from the regularity of single and double layer potentials.

== Calderón projector ==
There is another consequence of the laws governing the derivatives, which completes the symmetry of the jump relations, is that normal derivative of the double layer potential has no jump across the boundary, i.e. it has a continuous extension to a tubular neighbourhood of the boundary given by

$$\displaystyle{H(\varphi)=-\partial_n D(\varphi)|_{\partial\Omega} =-\partial_t(S(\partial_t\varphi)|_{\partial\Omega}).}$$

H is called a hypersingular operator. Although it takes smooth functions to smooth functions, it is not a bounded operator on L^{2}(∂Ω). In fact it is a pseudodifferential operator of order 1, so does define a bounded operator between Sobolev spaces on ∂Ω, decreasing the order by 1. It allows a 2 × 2 matrix of operators to be defined by

$$\displaystyle{C=\begin{pmatrix} {1\over 2}I + T_K & S\\ H & {1\over 2}I - T_K^*\end{pmatrix}.}$$

The matrix satisfies C^{2} = C, so is an idempotent, called the Calderón projector. This identity is equivalent the following classical relations, the first of which is the symmetrization relation of Plemelj:

$$\displaystyle{ST^*=TS,\,\,\,SH={1\over 4}I - T^2,\,\,\, HS={1\over 4}I - (T^*)^2, \,\,\, HT=T^*H.}$$

The operators T and S are pseudodifferential operators of order −1. The relations above follow by considering u = S(φ). It has boundary value Sφ) and normal derivative T* φ − φ/2. Hence in Ω

$$\displaystyle{u=D(S\varphi) - S(T^*\varphi) + S(\varphi)/2.}$$

Taking the boundary values of both sides and their normal derivative yields 2 equations. Two more result by considering D(Ψ); these imply the relations for the Calderón projector.

== Fredholm eigenvalues ==
The non-zero eigenvalues of the Neumann–Poincaré operator T_{K} are called the Fredholm eigenvalues of the region Ω. Since T_{K} is a compact operator, indeed a Hilbert–Schmidt operator, all non-zero elements in its spectrum are eigenvalues of finite multiplicity by the general theory of Fredholm operators. The solution of the boundary value requires knowledge of the spectrum at ± 1/2, namely that the constant function gives an eigenfunction with eigenvalue 1/2 and multiplicity one; that there are no corresponding generalized eigenfunctions with eigenvalue 1/2; and that -1/2 is not an eigenvalue. Plemelj (1911) proved that all non-zero eigenvalues are real and contained in the interval (-1/2,1/2]. Blumenfeld & Mayer (1914) proved that the other non-zero eigenvalues have an important symmetry property, namely that if λ is an eigenvalue with 0 < |λ| < 1/2, then so is –λ, with the same multiplicity. Plemelj also showed that T = T_{K} is a symmetrizable compact operator, so that, even though it is not self-adjoint, it shares many of the properties of self-adjoint operators. In particular there are no generalized eigenfunctions for non-zero eigenvalues and there is a variational principle similar to the minimax principle for determining the non-zero eigenvalues.

If λ ≠ 1/2 is an eigenvalue of T_{K}* then λ is real, with λ ≠ ± 1/2. Let φ be a corresponding eigenfunction and, following Plemelj, set u = S(φ). Then the jump formulas imply that

$$\displaystyle{\partial_{n\pm} u =(\lambda \mp{1\over 2})\varphi,}$$

and hence that

$$\displaystyle{(\lambda +{1\over 2}) \int_{\partial\Omega} \partial_{n+}u \, \overline{u} =(\lambda -{1\over 2}) \int_{\partial\Omega} \partial_{n-}u \, \overline{u}.}$$

Since ∫ φ = 0, u is harmonic at ∞. So by Green's theorem

$$\displaystyle{(\lambda +{1\over 2}) \iint_{\Omega} |u_x|^2 + |u_y|^2  = (\lambda -{1\over 2}) \iint_{\Omega^c} |u_x|^2 + |u_y|^2.}$$

If both the integrals vanish then u is constant on Ω and Ω^{c}. Since it is continuous and vanishes at ∞, it must therefore be identically 0, contradicting φ = ∂_{n+} - ∂_{n−}. So both integrals are strictly positive and hence λ must lie in (−½,½).

Let φ be an eigenfunction of T_{K}* with real eigenvalue λ satisfying 0 < |λ| < 1/2. If u = S(φ), then on ∂Ω

$$\displaystyle{u_+ = u_-,\,\,\, {\partial_{n+}u\over \lambda+{1\over 2}}={\partial_{n_-}u\over \lambda -{1\over 2}}=\varphi.}$$

This process can be reversed. Let u be a continuous function on R^{2} ∪ ∞ which is harmonic on Ω and Ω^{c} ∪ ∞ and such that the derivatives of u on Ω and Ω^{c} extend continuously to their closures. Suppose that

$$\displaystyle{{\partial_{n+}u\over \lambda + {1\over 2}}={\partial_{n_-}u\over\lambda - {1\over 2}}=\varphi.}$$

Let ψ be the restriction of u to ∂Ω. Then

$$\displaystyle{u|_\Omega = D(\psi) - (\lambda - {1\over 2})S(\varphi), \,\,\, u|_{\Omega^c} = -D(\psi) +(\lambda+{1\over 2})S(\varphi).}$$

The jump formulas for the boundary values and normal derivatives give

$$\displaystyle{\psi=T\psi +{1\over 2}\psi -(\lambda- {1\over 2})S\varphi=-(T\psi -{1\over 2}\psi) +(\lambda+{1\over 2})S\varphi}$$

and

$$\displaystyle{(\lambda-{1\over 2})\varphi=\partial_n D(\psi)|_{\partial \Omega} -(\lambda - {1\over 2})(T^*\varphi-{1\over 2}\varphi),\,\,\,\, (\lambda +{1\over 2})\varphi=-\partial_n D(\psi)|_{\partial\Omega} +(\lambda + {1\over 2})(T^*\varphi+{1\over 2}\varphi).}$$

It follows that

$$\displaystyle{T\psi=\lambda\psi, \,\,\, T^*\varphi =\lambda\varphi, \,\,\, S\varphi=\psi, \,\,\, \partial_n D(\psi)|_{\partial\Omega}=(\lambda^2 -{1\over 4})\varphi,}$$

so that ψ and φ are eigenfunctions of T and T* with eigenvalue λ.

Let u be a real harmonic function on Ω extending to a smooth function on its closure. The harmonic conjugate v of u is the unique real function on Ω such that u + i v is holomorphic. As such it must satisfy the Cauchy–Riemann equations:

$$\displaystyle{u_x=-v_y,\,\, u_y=v_x.}$$

If a is a point in Ω, a solution is given by

$$\displaystyle{v(z)=\int_a^z -u_y dx + u_x dy,}$$

where the integral is taken over any path in the closure of Ω. It is easily verified that v_{x} and v_{y} exist and are given by the corresponding derivatives of u. Thus v is a smooth function on the closure of Ω, vanishing at 0. By the Cauchy-Riemann equations, f = u + i v is smooth on the closure of Ω, holomorphic on Ω and f(a) = 0. Using the inversion map, the same result holds for a harmonic function in Ω^{c} harmonic at ∞. It has a harmonic conjugate v such that f = u + i v extends smoothly to the boundary and f is holomorphic on Ω ∪ ∞. Adjusting v by a constant it can be assumed that f(∞) = 0.

Following Schiffer (2011), let φ be an eigenfunction of T_{K}* with real eigenvalue λ satisfying 0 < |λ| < 1/2. Let u = S(φ) and let v_{±} be the harmonic conjugates of u_{±} in Ω and Ω^{c}. Since on ∂Ω

$$\displaystyle{u_+ = u_-,\,\,\, {\partial_{n+}u\over \lambda-{1\over 2}}={\partial_{n_-}u\over \lambda+{1\over 2}}=\varphi,}$$

the Cauchy-Riemann equations give on ∂Ω

$$\displaystyle{\partial_{n+}v=\partial_{n_-}v,\,\,\,\,v_+={\lambda+{1\over 2}\over \lambda - {1\over 2}}\cdot v_-.}$$

Now define

$$\displaystyle{U_-=v_-, \,\,\,\,U_+={\lambda+{1\over 2}\over \lambda - {1\over 2}}\cdot v_+.}$$

Thus U is continuous on R^{2} and

$$\displaystyle{\partial_{n+}U={\lambda-{1\over 2}\over \lambda + {1\over 2}}\cdot \partial_{n_-}U.}$$

It follows that −λ is an eigenvalue of T. Since −u is the harmonic conjugate of v, the process of taking harmonic conjugates is one-one, so the multiplicity of −λ as an eigenvalue is the same as that of λ.

By Green's theorem

$$\displaystyle{\iint_\Omega S(\varphi_1)_x S(\varphi_2)_x + S(\varphi_1)_yS(\varphi_2)_y =\int_{\partial\Omega}S(\varphi_1)\partial_{n-} S(\varphi_2),\,\,\,\iint_{\Omega^c} S(\varphi_1)_x S(\varphi_2)_x + S(\varphi_1)_yS(\varphi_2)_y =\int_{\partial\Omega}S(\varphi_1)\partial_{n-} S(\varphi_2).}$$

Adding the two integrals and using the jump relations for the single layer potential, it follows that

$$\displaystyle{\iint S(\varphi_1)_x S(\varphi_2)_x + S(\varphi_1)_yS(\varphi_2)_y = \int_{\partial\Omega} S(\varphi_1)\varphi_2.}$$

Thus

$$\displaystyle{(S\varphi,\varphi)=\int \|\nabla S(\phi)\|^2, \,\,\, (S\varphi_1,\varphi_2) = \int \nabla S(\varphi_1) \cdot \overline{\nabla S(\varphi_2)}.}$$

This shows that the operator S is self-adjoint and non-negative on L^{2}(∂Ω).

The image of S is dense (or equivalently it has zero kernel). In fact the relation SH = ¼ I - T^{2} =(½ I – T) (½ I + T) shows that the closure of the image of S contains the image of ½ I – T, which has codimension 1. Its orthogonal complement is given by the kernel of T – ½ I, i.e. the eigenfunction ψ such that T*ψ = ½ ψ. On the other hand ST=T* S. If the closure of the image is not the whole of L^{2}(∂Ω) then necessarily Sψ = 0. Hence S{ψ) is constant. But then ψ = ∂_{n+}S(ψ) – ∂_{n−}S(ψ) = 0, a contradiction.

Since S is strictly positive and T satisfies the Plemelj symmetrization relation ST* = TS, the operator T* is a symmetrizable compact operator. The operator S defines a new inner product on L^{2}(∂Ω):

$$\displaystyle{(f,g)_S=(Sf,g).}$$

The operator T* is formally self-adjoint with respect to this inner product and by general theory its restriction is bounded and it defines a self-adjoint Hilbert–Schmidt operator on the Hilbert space completion. Since T* is formally self-adjoint on this inner product space, it follows immediately that any generalized eigenfunction of T* must already be an eigenfunction. By Fredholm theory, the same is true for T. By general theory the kernel of T and its non-zero eigenspaces span a dense subspace of L^{2}(∂Ω). The Fredholm determinant is defined by

$$\displaystyle{\Delta(z)=\det (I -zT^2).}$$

It can be expressed in terms of the Fredholm eigenvalues λ_{n} with modulus less than 1/2, counted with multiplicity, as

$$\displaystyle{\Delta(z)=(1-z/4)\cdot \prod_{n\ge 1} (1-z\lambda_n^2).}$$

== Complex Hilbert transform ==
Now define the complex Hilbert transform or conjugate Beurling transform T_{c} on L^{2}(C) by

$$\displaystyle{T_c f(w)=\lim_{\varepsilon\rightarrow 0} - {1\over \pi } \iint_{|z-w|\ge \varepsilon} {\overline{f(z)} \over (z-w)^2}\, dx\,dy.}$$

This is a conjugate-linear isometric involution.

It commutes with ∂_{z̅} so carries A^{2}(Ω) ⊕ A^{2}(Ω^{c}) onto itself. The compression of T_{c} to A^{2}(Ω) is denoted T_{Ω}.

If F is a holomorphic univalent map from the unit disk D onto Ω then the Bergman space of Ω and its conjugate can be identified with that of D and T_{Ω} becomes the conjugate-linear singular integral operator with kernel

$$K_F(z,w)={F^\prime(z)F^\prime(w)\over (F(z)-F(w))^2}.$$

It defines a contraction. On the other hand, it can be checked that T_{D} = 0 by computing directly on powers z̅^{n} using Stokes theorem to transfer the integral to the boundary.

It follows that the conjugate-linear operator with kernel

$$\displaystyle{  {F^\prime(z)F^\prime(w)\over (F(z)-F(w))^2} \,-\,{1\over (z-w)^2}}$$

acts as a contraction on the Bergman space of D. It is thus a Hilbert–Schmidt operator.

The conjugate-linear operator T = T_{Ω} satisfies the self-adjointness relation

$$\displaystyle{(Tu,v)=(Tv,u)}$$

for u, v in A^{2}(Ω).

Thus A = T^{2} is a compact self-adjoint linear operator on H with

$$\displaystyle{(Au,u)=(Tu,Tu)=\|Tu\|^2\ge 0,}$$

so that A is a positive operator. By the spectral theorem for compact self-adjoint operators, there is an orthonormal basis u_{n} of H consisting of eigenvectors of A:

$$\displaystyle{Au_n=\mu_n u_n,}$$

where μ_{n} is non-negative by the positivity of A. Hence

$$\displaystyle{\mu_n=\lambda_n^2}$$

with λ_{n} ≥ 0. Since T commutes with A, it leaves its eigenspaces invariant. The positivity relation shows that it acts trivially on the zero eigenspace. The other non-zero eigenspaces are all finite-dimensional and mutually orthogonal. Thus an orthonormal basis can be chosen on each eigenspace so that:

$$\displaystyle{Tu_n=\lambda_n u_n.},$$

and

$$\displaystyle{ T(iu_n)=-\lambda_n iu_n}$$

by conjugate-linearity of T.

== Connection with Hilbert transform on a closed curve ==
The Neumann–Poincaré operator is defined on real functions f as

$$\displaystyle{Tf(w)={1\over 2\pi}\int_{\partial\Omega}\partial_n (\log|z-w|) f(z)={1\over 2}\Re (Hf)(w),}$$

where H is the Hilbert transform on ∂Ω. Let J denote complex conjugation. Writing h = f + ig,

$$\displaystyle{2Th =\Re(Hf) + i\Re(Hg)={1\over 2} (Hf +JHf +iHg +iJHg)={1\over 2}(H+JHJ)h}$$

so that

$$\displaystyle{T={1\over 4} (H +JHJ),}$$

The imaginary part of the Hilbert transform can be used to establish the symmetry properties of the eigenvalues of T_{K}. Let

$$\displaystyle{A={1\over 2} (H+JHJ),\,\,\,\, B={1\over 2i} (H-JHJ),}$$

so that

$$\displaystyle{H=A+iB.}$$

Then

$$\displaystyle{AB=-BA,\,\,\,\,A^2-B^2 =I.}$$

The Cauchy idempotent E satisfies E1 = 1 = E*1. Since J1 = 1, it follows that E and E* leave invariant L^{2}_{0}(∂Ω), the functions orthogonal to constant functions. The same is also true of A = 2 T_{K} and B. Let A_{1} and B_{1} be their restrictions. Since 1 is an eigenvector of T_{K} with eigenvalue 1/2 and multiplicity one and T_{K} + ½ I is invertible,

$$\displaystyle{A_1^2 -I =B_1^2}$$

is invertible, so that B_{1} is invertible. The equation A_{1}B_{1} = − B_{1} A_{1} implies that if λ is an eigenvalue of A_{1} then so is −λ and they have the same multiplicity.

== Eigenfunctions of complex Hilbert transform ==
The links between the Neumann–Poincaré operator and geometric function theory appeared first in Bergman & Schiffer (1951). The precise relationship between single and double layer potentials, Fredholm eigenvalues and the complex Hilbert transform is explained in detail in Schiffer (1981). Briefly given a smooth Jordan curve, the complex derivatives of its single and double layer potentials are −1 and +1 eigenfunctions of the complex Hilbert transform.

Let 𝕳 be the direct sum

$$\displaystyle{\mathfrak{H}=\mathfrak{H}(\overline{\Omega})\oplus \mathfrak{H}(\overline{\Omega^c}),}$$

where the first space consists of functions smooth on the closure of Ω and harmonic on Ω; and the second consists of functions smooth on the closure of Ω^{c}, harmonic on Ω^{c} and at ≈. The space 𝕳 is naturally an inner product space with corresponding norm given by

$$\displaystyle{\|f_-\oplus f_+\|_{\mathfrak{H}}^2=\iint_\Omega |\nabla f_-|^2 + \iint_{\Omega^c} |\nabla f_+|^2.}$$

Each element of 𝕳 can be written uniquely as the restriction of the sum of a double layer and single layer potential, provided that the moments are normalized to have 0 integral on ∂Ω. Thus for f_{−} ⊕ f_{+} in 𝕳, there are unique φ, ψ in C^{∞}(∂Ω) with integral 0 such that

$$\displaystyle{f_-=D(\varphi)|_{\Omega} + S(\psi)|_\Omega,\,\,\,\,\, f_+=D(\varphi)|_{\Omega^c} + S(\psi)|_{\Omega^c}.}$$

Under this correspondence

$$\displaystyle{\varphi=f_-|_{\partial \Omega} - f_+|_{\partial\Omega},\,\,\,\, \psi=\partial_{n}f_-|_{\partial\Omega} -\partial_{n} f_+|_{\partial\Omega}.}$$

The layer potentials can be identified with their images in 𝕳:

$$\displaystyle{D(\varphi)=D(\varphi)|_\Omega \oplus D(\varphi)|_{\Omega^c},\,\,\,\, S(\psi)=S(\psi)|_\Omega \oplus S(\psi)_{\Omega^c}.}$$

The space of double layer potentials is orthogonal to the space of single layer potentials for the inner product. In fact by Green's theorem

$$\displaystyle{(S,D)=\iint_{\Omega \cup \Omega^c}\nabla S\cdot \nabla D= -\int_{\partial\Omega} S\partial_n D + \int_{\partial\Omega} S\partial_n D=0.}$$

Define an isometric embedding of 𝕳_{R} in L^{2}(C) by

$$\displaystyle{U(f_- \oplus f_+) =(\partial_{z} f_-)\chi_\Omega + (\partial_{z} f_-)\chi_{\Omega^c}.}$$

The image lies in A^{2}(Ω) ⊕ A^{2}(Ω^{c}), the direct sum of the Bergman spaces of square integrable holomorphic functions on Ω and Ω^{c}. Since polynomials in z are dense in A^{2}(Ω) and polynomials in z^{−1} without constant term are dense in A^{2}(Ω^{c}), the image of U is dense in A^{2}(Ω) ⊕ A^{2}(Ω^{c}).

It can be verified directly that for φ, ψ real

$$\displaystyle{T_c(U(D(\varphi) + S(\psi)))=U(D(\varphi)-S(\psi)).}$$

In fact for single layer potentials, applying Green's theorem on the domain Ω ∪ Ω^{c} with a small closed disk of radius ε removed around a point w of the domain, it follows that

$$\displaystyle{\iint_{\Omega\cup\Omega^c, \,\, |z-w| >\varepsilon} \nabla N(w-z) \cdot \nabla  S(\psi)(z)  \,dx\, dy=-\int_{|z-w| =\varepsilon} \partial_n N(z-w)\,S(\psi)(z)=-S(\psi)(z),}$$

since the mean of a harmonic function over a circle is its value at the centre. Using the fact that π̅z̅^{−1} is the fundamental solution for ∂_{w}, this can be rewritten as

$$\displaystyle{{1\over \pi} \,\iint_{\Omega\cup\Omega^c}{\overline{\partial_z S(\psi)(z)}\over z-w}\,dx\,dy= -S(\psi)(w).}$$

Applying ∂_{w} to both sides gives

$$\displaystyle{T_c(\partial_z S(\psi)) = -\partial_z S(\psi).}$$

Similarly for a double layer potential

$$\displaystyle{\iint_{\Omega\cup\Omega^c, \,\, |z-w| >\varepsilon} \nabla N(w-z) \cdot \nabla  D(\varphi)(z) \,dx\, dy=\int_{|z-w| =\varepsilon} N(z-w)\,\partial_n D(\varphi)(z)=0,}$$

since the mean of the normal derivative of a harmonic function over a circle is zero. As above, using the fact π̅z̅^{−1} is the fundamental solution for ∂_{w}, this can be rewritten in terms of complex derivatives as

$$\displaystyle{{1\over \pi} \,\iint_{\Omega\cup\Omega^c}{\overline{\partial_z D(\varphi)(z)}\over z-w}\,dx\,dy= D(\varphi)(w).}$$

Applying ∂_{w} to both sides,

$$\displaystyle{T_c(\partial_z D(\varphi)) = \partial_z D(\varphi).}$$

== Connection with Hilbert transform on a domain ==
Let L^{2}(∂Ω)_{0} be the closed subspace of L^{2}(∂Ω) orthogonal to the constant functions. Let P_{0} the orthogonal projection onto L^{2}(∂Ω)_{0} and set

$$\displaystyle{T_{K,0}=P_0 T_K P_0.}$$

With respect to the new inner product on L^{2}(∂Ω)_{0}

$$\displaystyle{(f,g)_0=((1/2-T_K)^{-1}Sf,g)}$$

the operator T_{K,0} is formally self-adjoint.

Let H_{0} be the Hilbert space completion.

Define a unitary operator V from H_{0} onto A^{2}(Ω) by

$$\displaystyle{V(\psi)=U(D(\varphi)+S(\psi))|_{\Omega},}$$

where

$$\displaystyle{({1\over 2} I-T_K)\varphi= -S\psi.}$$

Then

$$\displaystyle{VT_{K,0}V^*=T_\Omega.}$$

== Fredholm eigenfunctions ==
If φ is an eigenfunction of T_{K} on ∂Ω corresponding to an eigenvalue λ with |λ| < 1/2, then φ is orthogonal to the constants and can be taken real-valued. Let

$$\displaystyle{\Phi_-=\partial_z D(\varphi)|_\Omega \in A^2(\Omega),\,\,\, \Phi_+=\partial_z D(\varphi)|_{\Omega^c}\in A^2(\Omega^c).}$$

Since double potentials are harmonic, given as the real part of a holomorphic function,

$$\displaystyle{\Phi_{\pm}(w)={1\over 2\pi i}\int_{\partial \Omega} {\varphi(z)\over (z-w)^2} \,dz.}$$

Then

$$\displaystyle{T_\Omega \Phi_-=\lambda \Phi_-,\,\,\, T_{\Omega^c} \Phi_+=\lambda \Phi_+.}$$

Moreover

$$\displaystyle{(T_c \Phi_-)|_{\Omega^c}= (\lambda + {1\over 2})\Phi_+,\,\,\,(T_c \Phi_+)|_{\Omega}=(\lambda-{1\over 2})\Phi_-.}$$

If two eigenfunctions φ and ψ are orthogonal for the inner product defined by S, then their transforms Φ_{±} and Ψ_{±} are orthogonal in A^{2}(Ω) and A^{2}(Ω^{c}).

== Eigenfunctions in Hardy space ==
The Hardy space H^{2}(∂Ω) can be defined as the closure of the complex polynomials in z in L^{2}(∂Ω). The Cauchy transform of f in H^{2}(∂Ω)

$$\displaystyle{F(w)={1\over 2\pi i}\int_{\partial\Omega} {f(z)\over z-w}\, dz}$$

defines a holomorphic function F in Ω such that its restrictions to the level curves ∂Ω^{s} in a tubular neighbourhood of ∂Ω have uniformly bounded L^{2} norms. The classical definition of Hardy space is of holomorphic functions on Ω with this property. Identifying the level curves with ∂Ω, it follows that the restrictions of F tend to f in L^{2} norm. Writing H^{2}(Ω) for the classical Hardy space, identified with H^{2}(∂Ω) by taking L^{2} boundary values, it follows that Hardy space H^{2}(Ω) is a dense subspace of Bergman space A^{2}(Ω).

Define the conjugate Cauchy transform of f by

$$\displaystyle{Cf(w)={1\over 2\pi i}\int_{\partial\Omega} {\overline{f(z)}\over z-w}\, d\overline{z}.}$$

It lies in H^{2}(Ω). Moreover, for w in Ω

$$\displaystyle{Cf(w)=T_\Omega F(w),}$$

since by Green's theorem

$$\displaystyle{{1\over \pi}\iint_{\Omega,\,\,\,|z-w|>\varepsilon} {\overline{F(z)}\over (z-w)^2} \,dx\,dy = Cf(w) -{1\over 2\pi i} \int_{|z-w|=\varepsilon} {\overline{F(z)}\over z-w}\, d\overline{z}=Cf(w).}$$

For a smooth Jordan curve ∂Ω, the Fredholm eigenfunctions of T_{Ω} all lie in H^{2}(Ω).

== See also ==
- Grunsky matrix
- Planar Riemann surface
