= Goertzel =

- Goertzel algorithm, an algorithm used in digital signal processing
- Gerald Goertzel, author of the Goertzel algorithm
- Ben Goertzel, American researcher in the field of artificial intelligence
