= Singular integral operators on closed curves =

In mathematics, singular integral operators on closed curves arise in problems in analysis, in particular complex analysis and harmonic analysis. The two main singular integral operators, the Hilbert transform and the Cauchy transform, can be defined for any smooth Jordan curve in the complex plane and are related by a simple algebraic formula. In the special case of Fourier series for the unit circle, the operators become the classical Cauchy transform, the orthogonal projection onto Hardy space, and the Hilbert transform a real orthogonal linear complex structure. In general the Cauchy transform is a non-self-adjoint idempotent and the Hilbert transform a non-orthogonal complex structure. The range of the Cauchy transform is the Hardy space of the bounded region enclosed by the Jordan curve. The theory for the original curve can be deduced from that of the unit circle, where, because of rotational symmetry, both operators are classical singular integral operators of convolution type. The Hilbert transform satisfies the jump relations of Plemelj and Sokhotski, which express the original function as the difference between the boundary values of holomorphic functions on the region and its complement. Singular integral operators have been studied on various classes of functions, including Hölder spaces, L^{p} spaces and Sobolev spaces. In the case of L^{2} spaces—the case treated in detail below—other operators associated with the closed curve, such as the Szegő projection onto Hardy space and the Neumann–Poincaré operator, can be expressed in terms of the Cauchy transform and its adjoint.

== Operators on the unit circle ==
If f is in L^{2}(T), then it has a Fourier series expansion

$$\displaystyle{f(\theta)=\sum_{n\in {\mathbf Z}} a_n e^{in\theta}.}$$

Hardy space H^{2}(T) consists of the functions for which the negative coefficients vanish, a_{n} = 0 for n < 0. These are precisely the square-integrable functions that arise as boundary values of holomorphic functions in the unit disk |z| < 1. Indeed, f is the boundary value of the function

$$\displaystyle{F(z)=\sum_{n\ge 0} a_n z^n,}$$

in the sense that the functions

$$\displaystyle{f_r(\theta)=F(re^{i\theta})},$$

defined by the restriction of F to the concentric circles |z| = r, satisfy

$\displaystyle{\|f_r-f\|_2 \rightarrow 0}$ as $\displaystyle{r \rightarrow 1}$.

The orthogonal projection P of L^{2}(T) onto H^{2}(T) is called the Szegő projection. It is a bounded operator on L^{2}(T) with operator norm 1.

By Cauchy's theorem

$$\displaystyle{F(z)= {1\over 2\pi i} \int_{|\zeta|=1}  {f(\zeta)\over \zeta -z} \,d\zeta={1\over 2\pi} \int_{-\pi}^{\pi} {f(\theta) \over 1-e^{-i\theta}z} \, d\theta.}$$

Thus

$$\displaystyle{F(re^{i\varphi})={1\over 2\pi} \int_{-\pi}^{\pi} {f(\varphi-\theta) \over 1-re^{i\theta}} \, d\theta.}$$

When r equals 1, the integrand on the right hand side has a singularity at θ = 0. The truncated Hilbert transform is defined by

$$\displaystyle{H^\varepsilon f(\varphi) = {i\over \pi} \int_{\varepsilon\le |\theta| \le  \pi} {f(\varphi-\theta) \over 1-e^{i\theta}} \, d\theta={1\over \pi} \int_{|\zeta-e^{i\varphi}|\ge \delta} {f(\zeta)\over \zeta-e^{i\varphi}}\, d\zeta,}$$

where δ = |1 – e^{iε}|. Since it is defined as convolution with a bounded function, it is a bounded operator on L^{2}(T). Now

$$\displaystyle{H^\varepsilon{1}={i\over\pi}\int_\varepsilon^\pi 2 \Re (1-e^{i\theta})^{-1} \,  d\theta ={i\over\pi}\int_\varepsilon^\pi 1 \, d\theta = i - {i \varepsilon\over \pi}.}$$

If f is a polynomial in z then

$$\displaystyle{H^\varepsilon f(z) - {i(1-\varepsilon)\over \pi} f(z)={1\over \pi i} \int_{|\zeta -z|\ge \delta} {f(\zeta)-f(z)\over \zeta -z} \, d\zeta.}$$

By Cauchy's theorem the right hand side tends to 0 uniformly as ε, and hence δ, tends to 0. So

$$\displaystyle{H^\varepsilon f \rightarrow if}$$

uniformly for polynomials. On the other hand, if u(z) = z it is immediate that

$$\displaystyle{\overline{H^\varepsilon f} = - u^{-1} H^\varepsilon( u \overline{f}).}$$

Thus if f is a polynomial in z^{−1} without constant term

$\displaystyle{H^\varepsilon f \rightarrow -i f}$ uniformly.

Define the Hilbert transform on the circle by

$$\displaystyle{H=i(2P-I).}$$

Thus if f is a trigonometric polynomial

$\displaystyle{H^\varepsilon f \rightarrow Hf}$ uniformly.

It follows that if f is any L^{2} function

$\displaystyle{H^\varepsilon f \rightarrow Hf}$ in the L^{2} norm.

This is a consequence of the result for trigonometric polynomials since the H_{ε} are uniformly bounded in operator norm: indeed their Fourier coefficients are uniformly bounded.

It also follows that, for a continuous function f on the circle, H_{ε}f converges uniformly to Hf, so in particular pointwise. The pointwise limit is a Cauchy principal value, written

$$\displaystyle{Hf= \mathrm{P.V.}\,{1\over \pi} \int {f(\zeta)\over \zeta-e^{i\varphi}}\, d\zeta.}$$

The Hilbert transform has a natural compatibility with orientation-preserving diffeomorphisms of the circle. Thus if H is a diffeomorphism of the circle with

$$\displaystyle{H(e^{i\theta})=e^{ih(\theta)},\,\,\, h(\theta+2\pi)=h(\theta)+2\pi,}$$

then the operators

$$\displaystyle{H^\varepsilon_h f(e^{i\varphi})={1\over \pi}\int_{|e^{ih(\theta)} -e^{ih(\varphi)}|\ge \varepsilon}
{f(e^{i\theta})\over e^{i\theta}-e^{i\varphi}} \, e^{i\theta}\, d\theta,}$$

are uniformly bounded and tend in the strong operator topology to H. Moreover, if Vf(z) = f(H(z)), then VHV^{−1} – H is an operator with smooth kernel, so a Hilbert–Schmidt operator.

== Hardy spaces ==
The Hardy space on the unit circle can be generalized to any multiply connected bounded domain Ω with smooth boundary ∂Ω. The Hardy space H^{2}(∂Ω) can be defined in a number of equivalent ways. The simplest way to define it is as the closure in L^{2}(∂Ω) of the space of holomorphic functions on Ω which extend continuously to smooth functions on the closure of Ω. As Walsh proved, in a result that was a precursor of Mergelyan's theorem, any holomorphic function on Ω that extends continuously to the closure can be approximated in the uniform norm by a rational function with poles in the complementary region Ω^{c}. If Ω is simply connected, then the rational function can be taken to be a polynomial. There is a counterpart of this theorem on the boundary, the Hartogs–Rosenthal theorem, which states that any continuous function ∂Ω can be approximated in the uniform norm by rational functions with poles in the complement of ∂Ω. It follows that for a simply connected domain when ∂Ω is a simple closed curve, H^{2}(∂Ω) is just the closure of the polynomials; in general it is the closure of the space of rational functions with poles lying off ∂Ω.

On the unit circle an L^{2} function f with Fourier series expansion

$$\displaystyle{f(e^{i\theta})=\sum a_n e^{in\theta}}$$

has a unique extension to a harmonic function in the unit disk given by the Poisson integral

$$\displaystyle{f(re^{i\theta}) =P_r f(e^{i\theta}) =\sum a_n r^{|n|} e^{in\theta}.}$$

In particular

$$\displaystyle{\|P_rf\|^2=\sum |a_n|^2 r^{2|n|},}$$

so that the norms increase to the value at r = 1, the norm of f. A similar in the complement of the unit disk where the harmonic extension is given by

$$\displaystyle{F_R(e^{i\theta})=F(Re^{i\theta})=\sum a_n R^{-|n|}a_ne^{in\theta}.}$$

In this case the norms increase from the value at R = ∞ to the norm of f, the value at R = 1.

A similar result holds for a harmonic function f on a simply connected region with smooth boundary provided the L^{2} norms are taken over the level curves in a tubular neighbourhood of the boundary. Using vector notation v(t) = (x(t), y(t)) to parametrize the boundary curve by arc length, the following classical formulas hold:

$$\displaystyle{\dot{\mathbf{v}}\cdot \dot{\mathbf{v}} =1,\,\,\, \ddot{\mathbf{v}}\cdot \dot{\mathbf{v}} = 0.}$$

Thus the unit tangent vector t(t) at t and oriented normal vector n(t) are given by

$$\displaystyle{\mathbf{t} =\dot{\mathbf{v}},\,\,\,\,\,\,\mathbf{n}=(-\dot{y},\dot{x}).}$$

The constant relating the acceleration vector to the normal vector is the curvature of the curve:

$$\displaystyle{\ddot{\mathbf{v}}=\kappa(t)\,\mathbf{n}(t),\,\,\,\,\, \kappa(t) =\ddot{\mathbf{v}}\cdot \mathbf{n}=\ddot{y}\dot {x} - \ddot{x}\dot{y}.}$$

There are two further formulas of Frenet:

$$\displaystyle{\dot{\mathbf{n}}=-\kappa \mathbf{t},\,\,\, \ddot{\mathbf{n}}= \dot{\kappa}\mathbf{n} -\kappa^2 \mathbf{t}.}$$

A tubular neighbourhood of the boundary is given by

$$\displaystyle{\mathbf{v}_s(t)=\mathbf{v}(t)+s\mathbf{n}(t),}$$

so that the level curves ∂Ω_{s} with s constant bound domains Ω_{s}. Moreover

$$\displaystyle{\dot{\mathbf{v}}_s(t) =(1-s\kappa)\mathbf{t},\,\,\,\,\partial_s |\dot{\mathbf{v}}_s|=-\kappa.}$$

Hence differentiating the integral means with respect to s, the derivative in the direction of the inward pointing normal, gives

$$\displaystyle{\partial_s \int_{\partial\Omega_s} |f|^2 =-\int_{\partial\Omega_s} (\partial_n f \overline{f} + f \overline{\partial_n f}) -  \int_{\partial\Omega_s} \kappa(1-\kappa s)^{-1}|f|^2 = -2\iint_{\Omega_s} |\nabla f|^2 -  \int_{\partial\Omega_s} \kappa(1-\kappa s)^{-1}|f|^2,}$$

using Green's theorem. Thus for s small

$$\displaystyle{\partial_s \|f|_{\partial \Omega_s}\|^2 \le M  \|f|_{\partial \Omega_s}\|^2,}$$

for some constant M independent of f. This implies that

$$\displaystyle{\partial_s e^{-Ms}\|f|_{\partial \Omega_s}\|^2 \le 0,}$$

so that, on integrating this inequality, the norms are bounded near the boundary:

$$\displaystyle{\|f|_{\partial \Omega_s}\| \le e^{Ms/2} \|f|_{\partial \Omega}\|.}$$

This inequality shows that a function in the L^{2} Hardy space H^{2}(Ω) leads, via the Cauchy integral operator C, to a holomorphic function on Ω satisfying the classical condition that the integral means

$$\displaystyle{ \int_{\partial\Omega_s} |f|^2}$$

are bounded. Furthermore, the restrictions f_{s} of f to ∂Ω_{s}, which can be naturally identified with ∂Ω, tend in L^{2} to the original function in Hardy space. In fact H^{2}(Ω) has been defined as the closure in L^{2}(Ω) of rational functions (which can be taken to be polynomials if Ω is simply connected). Any rational function with poles only in Ω^{c} can be recovered inside Ω from its boundary value g by Cauchy's integral formula

$$\displaystyle{Cg(a)={1\over 2\pi i}\int_{\partial\Omega} {g(z)\over z-a}\, dz.}$$

The estimates above show that the functions Cg|_{∂Ω_{s}} depend continuously on Cg|_{∂Ω}. Moreover, in this case the functions tend uniformly to the boundary value and hence also in L^{2}, using the natural identification of the spaces L^{2}(∂Ω_{s}) with L^{2}(∂Ω). Since Ch can be defined for any L^{2} function as a holomorphic function on Ω since h is integrable on ∂Ω. Since h is a limit in L^{2} of rational functions g, the same results hold for h and Ch, with the same inequalities for the integral means. Equally well h is the limit in L^{2}(∂Ω) of the functions Ch|_{∂Ω_{s}}.

The estimates above for the integral means near the boundary show that Cf lies in L^{2}(Ω) and that its L^{2} norm can be bounded in terms of that of f. Since Cf is also holomorphic, it lies in the Bergman space A^{2}(Ω) of Ω. Thus the Cauchy integral operator C defines a natural mapping from the Hardy space of the boundary into the Bergman space of the interior.

The Hardy space H^{2}(Ω) has a natural partner, namely the closure in L^{2}(∂Ω) of boundary values of rational functions vanishing at ∞ with poles only in Ω. Denoting this subspace by H^{2}_{+}(∂Ω) to distinguish it from the original Hardy space, which will also denoted by H^{2}_{−}(∂Ω), the same reasoning as above can be applied. When applied to a function h in H^{2}_{+}(∂Ω), the Cauchy integral operator defines a holomorphic function F in Ω^{c} vanishing at ∞ such that near the boundary the restriction of F to the level curves, each identified with the boundary, tend in L^{2} to h. Unlike the case of the circle, H^{2}_{−}(∂Ω) and H^{2}_{+}(∂Ω) are not orthogonal spaces. By the Hartogs−Rosenthal theorem, their sum is dense in L^{2}(∂Ω). As shown below, these are the ±i eigenspaces of the Hilbert transform on ∂Ω, so their sum is in fact direct and the whole of L^{2}(∂Ω).

== Hilbert transform on a closed curve ==
For a bounded simply connected domain Ω in the complex plane with smooth boundary ∂Ω, the theory of the Hilbert transform can be deduced by direct comparison with the Hilbert transform for the unit circle.

To define the Hilbert transform H_{∂Ω} on L^{2}(∂Ω), take ∂Ω to be parametrized by arclength and thus a function z(t). The Hilbert transform is defined to be the limit in the strong operator topology of the truncated operators H_{∂Ω}^{ε} defined by

$$\displaystyle{H_{\partial\Omega}^\varepsilon f(s) ={1\over \pi i} \int_{|s-t|\ge \varepsilon}\,\,\,\, {f(t)\over z(t)-z(s)}\, \dot{z}(t)\, dt.}$$

To make the comparison it will be convenient to apply a scaling transformation in C so that the length of ∂Ω is 2π. (This only changes the operators above by a fixed positive factor.) There is then a canonical unitary isomorphism of L^{2}(∂Ω) onto L^{2}(T), so the two spaces can be identified. The truncated operators H_{∂Ω}^{ε} can be compared directly with the truncated Hilbert transform H^{ε}:

$$\displaystyle{H_{\partial\Omega}^\varepsilon  g(s) -H^\varepsilon g(s) = {1\over \pi i} \int_{ |t-s|\ge \varepsilon}  K(s,t)\cdot g(t)\, dt,}$$

where

$$\displaystyle{K(u,v)={\dot{z}(t)\over z(t) - z(s)} - {ie^{it}\over e^{it}-e^{is}}= \partial_t \log\left( {z(t)-z(s)\over e^{it} - e^{is}}\right).}$$

The kernel K is thus smooth on T × T, so the difference above tends in the strong topology to the Hilbert–Schmidt operator defined by the kernel. It follows that the truncated operators H_{∂Ω}^{ε} are uniformly bounded in norm and have a limit in the strong operator topology denoted H_{∂Ω} and called the Hilbert transform on ∂Ω.

$$\displaystyle{H_{\partial\Omega}g = \lim_{\varepsilon\rightarrow 0} H^\varepsilon_{\partial\Omega}g.}$$

Letting ε tend to 0 above yields

$$\displaystyle{H_{\partial\Omega}  g(s) -H g(s) = {1\over \pi i} \int_0^{2\pi}  K(s,t)\cdot g(t)\, dt.}$$

Since H is skew-adjoint and H_{∂Ω} differs from H by a Hilbert–Schmidt operator with smooth kernel, it follows that H_{∂Ω} + H_{∂Ω}* is a Hilbert-Schmidt operator with smooth kernel. The kernel can also be computed explicitly using the truncated Hilbert transforms for ∂Ω:

$$\displaystyle{C(s,t) ={1\over \pi i}\left({\dot{z}(t)\over z(t) - z(s)} -{\overline{\dot{z}(s)}\over \overline{z(t)} -\overline{z(s)}} \right),}$$

and it can be verified directly that this is a smooth function on T × T.

== Plemelj–Sokhotski relation ==
Let C_{−} and C_{+} be the Cauchy integral operators for Ω and Ω^{c}. Then

$$\displaystyle{C_\pm \circ H = \pm i C_\pm.}$$

Since the operators C_{−}, C_{+} and H are bounded, it suffices to check this on rational functions F with poles off ∂Ω and vanishing at ∞ by the Hartogs–Rosenthal theorem. The rational function can be written as a sum of functions F = F_{−} + F_{+} where F_{−} has poles only in Ω^{c} and F_{+} has poles only in Let f, f_{±} be the restrictions of f, f_{±} to ∂Ω. By Cauchy's integral formula

$$\displaystyle{C_\pm f_\pm = F_\pm,\,\,\, C_\pm f_\mp = 0.}$$

On the other hand, it is straightforward to check that

$$\displaystyle{Hf_\pm = \pm i f_\pm.}$$

Indeed, by Cauchy's theorem, since F_{−} is holomorphic in Ω,

$$\displaystyle{\int_{\partial\Omega,\,\,|z-w|\ge \varepsilon} {f_-(z)\over z-w}\, dz=-\int_{|z-w|=\varepsilon,\,\,z\in \Omega}  {F_-(z)\over z-w}\, dz.}$$

As ε tends to 0, the latter integral tends to πi f_{−}(w) by the residue calculus. A similar argument applies to f_{+}, taking the circular contour on the right inside Ω^{c}.

By continuity it follows that H acts as multiplication by i on H^{2}_{−} and as multiplication by −i on H^{2}_{+}. Since these spaces are closed and their sum dense, it follows that

$$\displaystyle{H^2=-I.}$$

Moreover, H^{2}_{−} and H^{2}_{+} must be the ±i eigenspaces of H, so their sum is the whole of L^{2}(∂Ω). The Plemelj–Sokhotski relation for f in L^{2}(∂Ω) is the relation

$$\displaystyle{-iHf= C_-f|_{\partial\Omega} - C_+f|_{\partial\Omega}.}$$

It has been verified for f in the Hardy spaces H^{2}_{±}(∂Ω), so is true also for their sum. The Cauchy idempotent E is defined by

$$\displaystyle{H=i(2E-I).}$$

The range of E is thus H^{2}_{−}(∂Ω) and that of I − E is H^{2}_{+}(∂Ω). From the above

$$\displaystyle{Ef=C_-f|_{\partial\Omega},\,\,\,\, (I-E)f=C_+f|_{\partial\Omega}.}$$

== Operators on a closed curve ==
Two other operators defined on a closed curve ∂Ω can be expressed in terms of the Hilbert and Cauchy transforms H and E.

The Szegő projection P is defined to be the orthogonal projection onto Hardy space H^{2}(∂Ω). Since E is an idempotent with range H^{2}(∂Ω), P is given by the Kerzman–Stein formula:

$$\displaystyle{P=E(I+E-E^*)^{-1}.}$$

Indeed, since E − E* is skew-adjoint its spectrum is purely imaginary, so the operator I + E − E* is invertible. It is immediate that

$$\displaystyle{EP=P,\,\,\,PE=E.}$$

Hence PE* = P. So

$$\displaystyle{P(I+E-E^*)= P + E -P = E.}$$

Since the operator H + H* is a Hilbert–Schmidt operator with smooth kernel, the same is true for E − E*.

Moreover, if J is the conjugate-linear operator of complex conjugation and U the operator of multiplication by the unit tangent vector:

$$\displaystyle{Jf(t)=\overline{f(t)},\,\,\, Uf(t)=\dot{z}(t)\cdot f(t).}$$

then the formula for the truncated Hilbert transform on ∂Ω immediately yields the following identity for adjoints

$$\displaystyle{(H^\varepsilon)^*=JUH^\varepsilon U^*J.}$$

Letting ε tend to 0, it follows that

$$\displaystyle{H^*=JUH U^*J}$$

and hence

$$\displaystyle{I-E^*=JUEU^*J.}$$

The comparison with the Hilbert transform for the circle shows that commutators of H and E with diffeomorphisms of the circle are Hilbert–Schmidt operators. Similar their commutators with the multiplication operator corresponding to a smooth function f on the circle is also Hilbert–Schmidt operators. Up to a constant the kernel of the commutator with H is given by the smooth function

$$\displaystyle{A(s,t)={f(s) - f(t)\over z(s) - z(t)}.}$$

The Neumann–Poincaré operator T is defined on real functions f as

$$\displaystyle{Tf(w)={1\over 2\pi}\int_{\partial\Omega}\partial_n (\log|z-w|) f(z)={1\over 2}\Re (Hf)(w).}$$

Writing h = f + ig,

$$\displaystyle{2Th =\Re(Hf) + i\Re(Hg)={1\over 2} (Hf +JHf +iHg +iJHg)={1\over 2}(H+JHJ)h}$$

so that

$$\displaystyle{T={1\over 4} (H +JHJ)={1\over 4}(H+UH^*U^*),}$$

a Hilbert–Schmidt operator.

== Classical definition of Hardy space ==
The classical definition of Hardy space is as the space of holomorphic functions F on Ω for which the functions F_{s} = F|_{∂Ω_{s}} have bounded norm in L^{2}(∂Ω). An argument based on the Carathéodory kernel theorem shows that this condition is satisfied whenever there is a family of Jordan curves in Ω, eventually containing any compact subset in their interior, on which the integral means of F are bounded.

To prove that the classical definition of Hardy space gives the space H^{2}(∂Ω), take F as above. Some subsequence h_{n} = F_{s_{n}} converges weakly in L^{2}(∂Ω) to h say. It follows that Ch = F in Ω. In fact, if C_{n} is the Cauchy integral operator corresponding to Ω_{s_{n}}, then

$$\displaystyle{Ch(a)-F(a)= Ch(a) - C_nh_n(a)=C(h-h_n)(a) + [(C-C_n)h_n](a).}$$

Since the first term on the right hand side is defined by pairing h − h_{n} with a fixed L^{2} function, it tends to zero. If z_{n}(t) is the complex number corresponding to v_{s_{n}}, then

$$\displaystyle{[(C-C_n)h_n](a)={1\over 2\pi i} \int h_n(t) \left({\dot{z}(t) \over z(t)-a} - {\dot{z}_n(t) \over z_n(t)-a}\right)\, dt.}$$

This integral tends to zero because the L^{2} norms of h_{n} are uniformly bounded while the bracketed expression in the integrand tends to 0 uniformly and hence in L^{2}.

Thus F = Ch. On the other hand, if E is the Cauchy idempotent with range H^{2}(∂Ω), then C ∘ E = C. Hence F =Ch = C (Eh). As already shown F_{s} tends to Ch in L^{2}(∂Ω). But a subsequence tends weakly to h. Hence Ch = h and therefore the two definitions are equivalent.

== Generalizations ==
The theory for multiply connected bounded domains with smooth boundary follows easily from the simply connected case. There are analogues of the operators H, E and P. On a given component of the boundary, the singular contributions to H and E come from the singular integral on that boundary component, so the technical parts of the theory are direct consequences of the simply connected case.

Singular integral operators on spaces of Hölder continuous functions are discussed in Gakhov (1990). Their action on L^{p} and Sobolev spaces is discussed in Mikhlin & Prössdorf (1986).
