= John George Herriot =

American mathematician

- Born: 1916
- Died: March 16, 2003
- Other name: Jack
- Education: Brown University
- Known for: Numerical analysis; Co-founder of the Stanford University Computer Science Department
- Scientific career
- Fields: Mathematics; Computer science
- Workplaces: Stanford University
- Theses: Part I. Cesaro Summability of Ordinary Double Dirichlet Series; Part II. Norlund Summability of Double Fourier Series (1941)
- Doctoral advisors: Jacob David Tamarkin; Clarence Raymond Adams

John "Jack" George Herriot (1916 – March 16, 2003) was a mathematician and computer scientist at Stanford University who worked on numerical analysis. He co-founded the computer science department at Stanford in 1965.

Herriot received his Ph.D. from Brown University in 1941. He was a professor of mathematics and then of computer science at Stanford University from 1946 until his retirement in 1982. From 1953 to 1961, he was director of the Stanford Computation Center.

Herriot originally joined the Mathematics Department at Stanford University in 1942. He rejoined the department in 1946, after spending two years as a physicist with the Ames Aeronautical Laboratory based at Moffett Field in California. In 1953, Stanford University acquired its first computer, and Herriot, then a pure mathematician, became the first Director of the newly created Computation Center. In 1955, he taught the first programming course at Stanford, "Theory and Operation of Computing Machines", using a Model II IBM Card Programmed Calculator, initially to 25 students. In 1956, he started working with students in a new mathematics masters program entitled "Scientific Computation". In 1957, he helped recruit George Forsythe to the mathematics department. In 1961, together with George Forsythe, he founded the Computer Science Division within the Mathematics Department and started recruiting computer faculty members. In January 1965, the faculty members within the Computer Science Division moved to the newly founded Computer Science Department. He served as acting department chairman during 1966–67 and 1972–73. His principal interests were in numerical analysis, especially with regard to the development and description of algorithms useful for solving numerical analysis problems.

== Legacy ==
Stanford University produced the following Memorial Resolution on 2004:

Herriot was one of the founding members of the Computer Science department in 1966 [sic]. Herriot's major interests was in numerical analysis with a specialty in algorithm development. He was the author of an elementary book on the subject. He also helped to recruit George Forsythe to the campus, and Forsythe provided the energy and foresight to make the Stanford Computer Science Department world renown.

Herriot provided an oral history in 1979 and his papers are in the Stanford University Archives.

== Selected publications ==
- Cesàro summability of ordinary double Dirichlet series. Bull. Amer. Math. Soc. 46 (1940) Part 1: 920–929. MR 0003262
- Nörlund summability of double Fourier series. Trans. Amer. Math. Soc. 52 (1942) 72–94. MR 0006766
- "Blockage Corrections for Three-Dimensional-Flow Closed-Throat Wind Tunnels, With Consideration of the Effect of Compressibility." (1947).
- with Stefan Bergman: Bergman, Stefan; Herriot, John G. (1965). "Numerical solution of boundary-value problems by the method of integral operators". Numerische Mathematik. 7 (1): 42–65. doi:10.1007/BF01397972. S2CID 115951870.
- Methods of mathematical analysis and computation. New York, Wiley (1963) xiii+198 p. diagrs., tables. 24 cm.
- with Christian Reinsch: Herriot, John G.; Reinsch, Christian H. (1973). "Algorithm 472: Procedures for natural spline interpolation [E1]". Communications of the ACM. 16 (12): 763–768. doi:10.1145/362552.362558.
