= CQT =

CQT may refer to

- Centre for Quantum Technologies in Singapore
- Certified Quality Technician, an American Society for Quality certification
- Control Question Technique, used in polygraphs
- Crewman Qualification Training for the U.S. Navy's Special Warfare Combatant-craft Crewmen
- constant-Q transform, a short-time Fourier transform with logarithmic frequency resolution in signal processing
- IOC sport code for croquet at the Summer Olympics
