= Dirichlet space =

In mathematics, the Dirichlet space on the domain $\Omega \subseteq \mathbb{C}, \, \mathcal{D}(\Omega)$ (named after Peter Gustav Lejeune Dirichlet), is the reproducing kernel Hilbert space of holomorphic functions, contained within the Hardy space $H^2(\Omega)$, for which the Dirichlet integral, defined by

$$\mathcal{D}(f) := {1\over \pi} \iint_\Omega |f^\prime(z)|^2 \, dA = {1\over 4\pi}\iint_\Omega |\partial_x f|^2 + |\partial_y f|^2 \, dx \, dy$$

is finite (here dA denotes the area Lebesgue measure on the complex plane $\mathbb{C}$). The latter is the integral occurring in Dirichlet's principle for harmonic functions. The Dirichlet integral defines a seminorm on $\mathcal{D}(\Omega)$. It is not a norm in general, since $\mathcal{D}(f) = 0$ whenever f is a constant function.

For $f,\, g \in \mathcal{D}(\Omega)$, we define

$$\mathcal{D}(f, \, g) : = {1\over \pi} \iint_\Omega f'(z) \overline{g'(z)} \, dA(z).$$

This is a semi-inner product, and clearly $\mathcal{D}(f, \, f) = \mathcal{D}(f)$. We may equip $\mathcal{D}(\Omega)$ with an inner product given by

$$\langle f, g \rangle_{\mathcal{D}(\Omega)} := \langle f, \, g \rangle_{H^2 (\Omega)} + \mathcal{D}(f, \, g) \; \; \; \; \; (f, \, g \in \mathcal{D}(\Omega)),$$

where $\langle \cdot, \, \cdot \rangle_{H^2 (\Omega)}$ is the usual inner product on $H^2 (\Omega).$ The corresponding norm $\| \cdot \|_{\mathcal{D}(\Omega)}$ is given by

$$\|f\|^2_{\mathcal{D}(\Omega)} := \|f\|^2_{H^2 (\Omega)} + \mathcal{D}(f) \; \; \; \; \; (f \in \mathcal{D} (\Omega)).$$

Note that this definition is not unique, another common choice is to take $\|f\|^2 = |f(c)|^2 + \mathcal{D}(f)$, for some fixed $c \in \Omega$.

The Dirichlet space is not an algebra, but the space $\mathcal{D}(\Omega) \cap H^\infty(\Omega)$ is a Banach algebra, with respect to the norm

$$\|f\|_{\mathcal{D}(\Omega) \cap H^\infty(\Omega)} := \|f\|_{H^\infty(\Omega)} + \mathcal{D}(f)^{1/2} \; \; \; \; \; (f \in \mathcal{D}(\Omega) \cap H^\infty(\Omega)).$$

We usually have $\Omega = \mathbb{D}$ (the unit disk of the complex plane $\mathbb{C}$), in that case $\mathcal{D}(\mathbb{D}):=\mathcal{D}$, and if

$$f(z) = \sum_{n \ge 0} a_n z^n \; \; \; \; \; (f \in \mathcal{D}),$$

then

$$D(f) =\sum_{n\ge 1} n |a_n|^2,$$

and

$$\|f \|^2_\mathcal{D} = \sum_{n \ge 0} (n+1) |a_n|^2.$$

Clearly, $\mathcal{D}$ contains all the polynomials and, more generally, all functions $f$, holomorphic on $\mathbb{D}$ such that $f'$ is bounded on $\mathbb{D}$.

The reproducing kernel of $\mathcal{D}$ at $w \in \mathbb{C} \setminus \{ 0 \}$ is given by

$$k_w(z) = \frac{1}{z\overline{w}} \log \left( \frac{1}{1-z\overline{w}} \right) \; \; \; \; \; (z \in \mathbb{C} \setminus \{ 0 \}).$$

== See also ==
- Banach space
- Bergman space
- Hardy space
- Hilbert space
