= Bergman metric =

In differential geometry, the Bergman metric is a Hermitian metric that can be defined on certain types of complex manifold. It is so called because it is derived from the Bergman kernel, both of which are named after Stefan Bergman.

== Definition ==
Let $G \subset {\mathbb{C}}^n$ be a domain and let $K(z,w)$ be the Bergman kernel on G. We define a Hermitian metric on the tangent bundle $T_z{\mathbb{C}}^n$ by

$$g_{ij} (z)
:=
\frac{\partial^2}{\partial z_i\, \partial \bar{z}_j}
\log K(z,z) ,$$

for $z \in G$. Then the length of a tangent vector $\xi \in T_z{\mathbb{C}}^n$ is given by

$$\left\vert \xi \right\vert_{B,z}:=\sqrt{\sum_{i,j=1}^n g_{ij}(z) \xi_i \bar{\xi}_j }.$$

This metric is called the Bergman metric on G.

The length of a (piecewise) C^{1} curve $\gamma \colon [0,1] \to {\mathbb{C}}^n$ is then computed as

$$\ell (\gamma) =
\int_0^1 \left\vert \frac{\partial \gamma}{\partial t}(t) \right\vert_{B,\gamma(t)} dt .$$

The distance $d_G(p,q)$ of two points $p,q \in G$ is then defined as

$$d_G(p,q):=
\inf \{ \ell (\gamma) \mid \text{ all piecewise }C^1\text{ curves }\gamma\text{ such that }\gamma(0)=p\text{ and }\gamma(1)=q \} .$$

The distance d_{G} is called the Bergman distance.

The Bergman metric is in fact a positive definite matrix at each point if G is a bounded domain. More importantly, the distance d_{G} is invariant under biholomorphic mappings of G to another domain $G'$. That is if f is a biholomorphism of G and $G'$, then $d_G(p,q) = d_{G'}(f(p),f(q))$.
