= Stefan Bergman =

American mathematician (1895–1977)

- Bergman in Zürich, 1932
- Born: May 5, 1895; Częstochowa, Congress Poland, Russian Empire
- Died: June 6, 1977 (aged 82); Palo Alto, California, USA
- Education: University of Vienna; University of Berlin
- Known for: Bergman kernel Bergman metric Bergman space
- Spouse: Adele Adlersberg
- Scientific career
- Workplaces: University of Berlin; Tomsk State University; MIT; Yeshiva University; Brown University; Stanford University
- Thesis: Über die Entwicklung der harmonischen Funktionen der Ebene und des Raumes nach Orthogonalfunktionen (1922)
- Doctoral advisor: Richard von Mises
- Doctoral students: Michael Maschler

Stefan Bergman (5 May 1895 – 6 June 1977) was a Poland-born American mathematician whose primary work was in complex analysis. He is known for the kernel function he discovered in 1922 at University of Berlin. This function is now known as the Bergman kernel. Bergman taught for many years at Stanford University.

== Biography ==
Born in Częstochowa, Congress Poland, Russian Empire, to a German Jewish family, Bergman received his Ph.D. at University of Berlin in 1921, for a dissertation on Fourier analysis. His advisor, Richard von Mises, had a strong influence on him, lasting for the rest of his career. In 1933, Bergman was forced to leave his post at the Berlin University because he was a Jew. He fled first to Russia, where he stayed until 1939, and then to Paris. In 1939, he emigrated to the United States, where he would remain for the rest of life. He was elected a Fellow of the American Academy of Arts and Sciences in 1951. He was a professor at Stanford University from 1952 until his retirement in 1972. He was an invited speaker at the International Congress of Mathematicians in 1950 in Cambridge, Massachusetts and in 1962 in Stockholm (On meromorphic functions of several complex variables). He died in Palo Alto, California, aged 82.

=== Bergman Prize ===
The Stefan Bergman Prize in mathematics was initiated by Bergman's wife in her will, in memory of her husband's work. The American Mathematical Society supports the prize and selects the committee of judges. The prize is awarded for:

1. the theory of the kernel function and its applications in real and complex analysis; or
2. function-theoretic methods in the theory of partial differential equations of elliptic type with a special attention to Bergman's and related operator methods.

== Selected publications ==
- Bergmann, Stefan (1933), "Über die Kernfunktion eines Bereiches und ihr Verhalten am Rande. I", Journal für die reine und angewandte Mathematik (in German), 1933 (169): 1–42, doi:10.1515/crll.1933.169.1, JFM 60.1025.01, S2CID 119758238.
- Bergmann, Stefan (1934), "Über eine in gewissen Bereichen mit Maximumfläche gültige Integraldarstellung der Funktionen zweier komplexer Variabler: I", Mathematische Zeitschrift (in German), 39: 76–94, doi:10.1007/BF01201345, S2CID 120856598, Zbl 0009.26202.
- Bergmann, Stefan (1935), "Über die Kernfunktion eines Bereiches und ihr Verhalten am Rande. II", Journal für die reine und angewandte Mathematik (in German), 1935 (172): 89–128, doi:10.1515/crll.1935.172.89, JFM 60.1025.01, S2CID 199546391.
- Bergmann, S. (1935), "Über eine in gewissen Bereichen mit Maximumfläche gültige Integraldarstellung der Funktionen zweier komplexer Variabler: II", Mathematische Zeitschrift (in German), 39: 605–608, doi:10.1007/BF01201376, JFM 61.0372.01, S2CID 186228345
- Bergmann, S. (1936), "Über eine Integraldarstellung von Funktionen zweier komplexer Veränderlichen", Recueil Mathématique (Matematicheskii Sbornik), New Series (in German), 1 (43) (6): 851–862, Zbl 0016.17001
- Bergmann, Stefan (1947) [1941], Sur les fonctions orthogonales de plusieurs variables complexes avec les applications à la théorie des fonctions analytiques., Mémorial des sciences mathématiques (in French), vol. 106 (2nd ed.), Paris: Gauthier-Villars, p. 61, JFM 67.0299.03, MR 0032776, Zbl 0036.05101. The original edition was published in 1941 by Interscience Publishers.
- Bergmann, Stefan (1948), Sur la fonction-noyau d'un domaine et ses applications dans la théorie des transformations pseudo-conformes., Mémorial des sciences mathématiques (in French), vol. 108, Paris: Gauthier-Villars, p. 80, MR 0032777, Zbl 0036.05201.
- The Kernel Function and Conformal Mapping, American Mathematical Society 1950, 2nd edn. 1970
- with Menahem Max Schiffer: Kernel Functions and elliptic differential equations in mathematical physics, Academic Press 1953
- with John G. Herriot: Application of the method of the kernel function for solving boundary value problems, Numerische Mathematik 3, 1961
- Integral operators in the theory of linear partial differential equations, Springer 1961, 2nd edn. 1969

== See also ==
- Bergman kernel
- Bergman metric
- Bergman space
- Bergman–Weil integral representation
