= Bergman kernel =

In the mathematical study of several complex variables, the Bergman kernel, named after Stefan Bergman, is the reproducing kernel for the Hilbert space (RKHS) of all square integrable holomorphic functions on a domain D in C^{n}.

In detail, let L^{2}(D) be the Hilbert space of square integrable functions on D, and let L^{2,h}(D) denote the subspace consisting of holomorphic functions in L^{2}(D): that is,

$$L^{2,h}(D) = L^2(D)\cap H(D)$$

where H(D) is the space of holomorphic functions in D. Then L^{2,h}(D) is a Hilbert space: it is a closed linear subspace of L^{2}(D), and therefore complete in its own right. This follows from the fundamental estimate, that for a holomorphic square-integrable function ƒ in D

$\sup_{z\in K} |f(z)| \le C_K\|f\|_{L^2(D)}$	1

for every compact subset K of D. Thus convergence of a sequence of holomorphic functions in L^{2}(D) implies also compact convergence, and so the limit function is also holomorphic.

Another consequence of (1) is that, for each z ∈ D, the evaluation

$$\operatorname{ev}_z : f\mapsto f(z)$$

is a continuous linear functional on L^{2,h}(D). By the Riesz representation theorem, this functional can be represented as the inner product with an element of L^{2,h}(D), which is to say that

$$\operatorname{ev}_z f = \int_D f(\zeta)\overline{\eta_z(\zeta)}\,d\mu(\zeta).$$

The Bergman kernel K is defined by

$$K(z,\zeta) = \overline{\eta_z(\zeta)}.$$

The kernel K(z,ζ) is holomorphic in z and antiholomorphic in ζ, and satisfies

$$f(z) = \int_D K(z,\zeta)f(\zeta)\,d\mu(\zeta).$$

One key observation about this picture is that L^{2,h}(D) may be identified with the space of $L^2$ holomorphic (n,0)-forms on D, via multiplication by $dz^1\wedge \cdots \wedge dz^n$. Since the $L^2$ inner product on this space is manifestly invariant under biholomorphisms of D, the Bergman kernel and the associated Bergman metric are therefore automatically invariant under the automorphism group of the domain.

The Bergman kernel for the unit disc D is the function
$$K(z,\zeta) = \frac{1}{\pi}\frac{1}{(1-z\bar\zeta)^2}.$$

== See also ==
- Bergman metric
- Bergman space
- Szegő kernel
