= Symmetrizable compact operator =

Mathematical compact operator

In mathematics, a symmetrizable compact operator is a compact operator on a Hilbert space that can be composed with a positive operator with trivial kernel to produce a self-adjoint operator. Such operators arose naturally in the work on integral operators of Hilbert, Korn, Lichtenstein and Marty required to solve elliptic boundary value problems on bounded domains in Euclidean space. Between the late 1940s and early 1960s the techniques, previously developed as part of classical potential theory, were abstracted within operator theory by various mathematicians, including M. G. Krein, William T. Reid, Peter Lax and Jean Dieudonné. Fredholm theory already implies that any element of the spectrum is an eigenvalue. The main results assert that the spectral theory of these operators is similar to that of compact self-adjoint operators: any spectral value is real; they form a sequence tending to zero; any generalized eigenvector is an eigenvector; and the eigenvectors span a dense subspace of the Hilbert space.

== Discussion ==
Let H be a Hilbert space. A compact operator K on H is symmetrizable if there is a bounded self-adjoint operator S on H such that S is positive with trivial kernel, i.e. (Sx,x) > 0 for all non-zero x, and SK is self-adjoint:

$$\displaystyle{SK=K^*S.}$$

In many applications S is also compact. The operator S defines a new inner product on H

$$\displaystyle{(x,y)_S= (Sx,y)}.$$

Let H_{S} be the Hilbert space completion of H with respect to this inner product.

The operator K defines a formally self-adjoint operator on the dense subspace H of H_{S}. As Krein (1947) and Reid (1951) noted, the operator has the same operator norm as K. In fact the self-adjointness condition implies

$$\displaystyle{SK^n = (K^*)^nS.}$$

It follows by induction that, if (x,x)_{S} = 1, then

$$\displaystyle{\|Kx\|_S|^{2^n}\le \|K^{2^{n}}x\|_S.}$$

Hence

$$\displaystyle{\|Kx\|_S\le \limsup_{n\rightarrow \infty} \|K\| (\|S\|\|x\|^2)^{1/2^n} =\|K\|}$$

If K is only compact, Krein gave an argument, invoking Fredholm theory, to show that K defines a compact operator on H_{S}. A shorter argument is available if K belongs to a Schatten class.

When K is a Hilbert–Schmidt operator, the argument proceeds as follows. Let R be the unique positive square root of S and for ε > 0 define

$$\displaystyle{A_\varepsilon = (R+\varepsilon I)^{-1}SK(R+\varepsilon I)^{-1}.}$$

These are self-adjoint Hilbert–Schmidt operator on H which are uniformly bounded in the Hilbert–Schmidt norm:

$$\displaystyle{\|A_\varepsilon\|_2^2=(R^2(R+\varepsilon I)^{-2}K, KR^2(R+\varepsilon I)^{-2})_2\le \|K\|_2^2,}$$

Since the Hilbert–Schmidt operators form a Hilbert space, there is a subsequence converging weakly to s self-adjoint Hilbert–Schmidt operator A. Since A_{ε} R tends to RK in Hilbert–Schmidt norm, it follows that

$$\displaystyle{RK=AR.}$$

Thus if U is the unitary induced by R between H_{S} and H, then the operator K_{S} induced by the restriction of K corresponds to A on H:

$$\displaystyle{UK_SU^*=A.}$$

The operators K − λI and K* − λI are Fredholm operators of index 0 for λ ≠ 0, so any spectral value of K or K* is an eigenvalue and the corresponding eigenspaces are finite-dimensional. On the other hand, by the special theorem for compact operators, H is the orthogonal direct sum of the eigenspaces of A, all finite-dimensional except possibly for the 0 eigenspace. Since RA = K* R, the image under R of the λ eigenspace of A lies in the λ eigenspace of K*. Similarly R carries the λ eigenspace of K into the λ eigenspace of A. It follows that the eigenvalues of K and K* are all real. Since R is injective and has dense range it induces isomorphisms between the λ eigenspaces of A, K and K*. The same is true for generalized eigenvalues since powers of K − λI and K* − λI are also Fredholm of index 0. Since any generalized λ eigenvector of A is already an eigenvector, the same is true for K and K*. For λ = 0, this argument shows that K^{m}x = 0 implies Kx = 0.

Finally the eigenspaces of K* span a dense subspace of H, since it contains the image under R of the corresponding space for A. The above arguments also imply that the eigenvectors for non-zero eigenvalues of K_{S} in H_{S} all lie in the subspace H.

Hilbert–Schmidt operators K with non-zero real eigenvalues λ_{n} satisfy the following identities proved by Carleman (1921):

$$\displaystyle{\mathrm{tr}\, K^2 = \sum \lambda_n^2,\,\,\, \det (I-zK^2) =\prod_{n=1}^\infty (1-z\lambda_n^2).}$$

Here tr is the trace on trace-class operators and det is the Fredholm determinant. For symmetrizable Hilbert–Schmidt operators the result states that the trace or determinant for K or K* is equal to the trace or determinant for A. For symmetrizable operators, the identities for K* can be proved by taking H_{0} to be the kernel of K* and H_{m} the finite dimensional eigenspaces for the non-zero eigenvalues λ_{m}. Let P_{N} be the orthogonal projection onto the direct sum of H_{m} with 0 ≤ m ≤ N. This subspace is left invariant by K*. Although the sum is not orthogonal the restriction P_{N}K*P_{N} of K* is similar by a bounded operator with bounded inverse to the diagonal operator on the orthogonal direct sum with the same eigenvalues. Thus

$$\displaystyle{\mathrm{tr}\,(P_NK^*P_N)^2 =\sum_{m=1}^N \lambda_m^2 \cdot \mathrm{dim}\, H_m,\,\,\, \mathrm{det}\, [P_N - z(P_NK^*P_N)^2] = \prod_{m=1}^N  (1-z\lambda_m^2)^{\mathrm{dim}\, H_m}.}$$

Since P_{N}K*P_{N} tends to K* in Hilbert–Schmidt norm, the identities for K* follow by passing to the limit as N tends to infinity.
