= Szegő kernel =

In the mathematical study of several complex variables, the Szegő kernel is an integral kernel that gives rise to a reproducing kernel on a natural Hilbert space of holomorphic functions. It is named for its discoverer, the Hungarian mathematician Gábor Szegő.

Let Ω be a bounded domain in C^{n} with C^{2} boundary, and let A(Ω) denote the space of all holomorphic functions in Ω that are continuous on $\overline{\Omega}$. Define the Hardy space H^{2}(∂Ω) to be the closure in L^{2}(∂Ω) of the restrictions of elements of A(Ω) to the boundary. The Poisson integral implies that each element ƒ of H^{2}(∂Ω) extends to a holomorphic function Pƒ in Ω. Furthermore, for each z ∈ Ω, the map

$$f\mapsto Pf(z)$$

defines a continuous linear functional on H^{2}(∂Ω). By the Riesz representation theorem, this linear functional is represented by a kernel k_{z}, which is to say

$$Pf(z) = \int_{\partial\Omega} f(\zeta)\overline{k_z(\zeta)}\,d\sigma(\zeta).$$

The Szegő kernel is defined by

$$S(z,\zeta) = \overline{k_z(\zeta)},\quad z\in\Omega,\zeta\in\partial\Omega.$$

Like its close cousin, the Bergman kernel, the Szegő kernel is holomorphic in z. In fact, if φ_{i} is an orthonormal basis of H^{2}(∂Ω) consisting entirely of the restrictions of functions in A(Ω), then a Riesz–Fischer theorem argument shows that

$$S(z,\zeta) = \sum_{i=1}^\infty \phi_i(z)\overline{\phi_i(\zeta)}.$$
