= Gerald Goertzel =

American theoretical physicist

- Born: August 18, 1919
- Died: July 17, 2002 (aged 82)
- Education: Stevens Institute of Technology; New York University
- Known for: Goertzel algorithm Founder of SAGE Instruments
- Scientific career
- Fields: Theoretical Physics
- Workplaces: New York University, IBM
- Thesis: Angular correlation of gamma rays (1947)
- Doctoral advisor: Irving S. Lowen

Gerald Howard Goertzel (18 August 1919 – 17 July 2002) was an American theoretical physicist. He worked on the Manhattan Project for the Nuclear Development Corporation of America and later for Sage Instruments. He was an employee of IBM's Research Division where he worked for 28 years in a variety of areas, including design automation, data compression and digital printing technology. He is best known for creating the Goertzel algorithm.

He graduated with a Bachelor of Science degree in Mechanical Engineering and subsequently gained a Master of Science degree in Physics from the Stevens Institute of Technology. He was awarded a PhD in Theoretical Physics from New York University.

== Publications ==
- Gerald Goertzel, "A Look at OREXX", May 1996. EDM/2 Magazine.
- Fred Mintzer, Gerhard Thompson, and Gerald Goertzel, "Efficiency and Quality in Binary Image Processing," SPSE's 42nd Annual Conference, Proceedings pp. 320–323, May 1989.
- Gerhard Thompson, Gerald Goertzel, and Fred Mintzer, "Recent Results in Halftoning for a 600 Pel-Per-Inch Printer," Electronic Imaging '89, Proceedings pp. 856–861, April 1989.
- Gerald Goertzel, "Digital halftoning on the IBM 4250 Printer," IBM Journal of Research and Development - IBMRD, vol. 31, no. 1, pp. 2–15, 1987.
- K.L. Anderson, F.C. Mintzer, G. Goertzel, J.L. Mitchell, K.S. Pennington, and W.B. Pennebaker, "Binary Image Manipulation Algorithms in the Image View Facility," IBM Journal of Research and Development, vol. 31, pp. 16–31, January 1987.
- G. Goertzel, C.J. Evangelisti, J.C. Lee, F.C. Mintzer, and G.R. Thompson, "A Color Separation and Digital Halftoning Technique for Color Lithography," Electronic Imaging '87, Proceedings pp. 85–90, January 1987.
- C. J. Evangelist, G. Goertzel, H. Ofek, "Using the dataflow analyzer on lcd descriptions of machines to generate control". 1979.
- A. E. Ruehli, P. K. Wolff, G. Goertzel, "Analytical power/timing optimization technique for digital system". Conference: Design Automation Conference - DAC, pp. 142–146, 1977.
- C. J. Evangelisti, G. Goertzel, H. Ofek, "Designing with LCD: language for computer design" Conference: Design Automation Conference - DAC, pp. 369–376, 1977.
- Gerald Goertzel, Nunzio Tralli, "Some mathematical methods of physics". 1960.
- Gerald Goertzel, Henry Leslie Garabedian, U.S. Atomic Energy Commission, "A method of solution of the critical mass problem for a thermal pile with slowing down properties independent of position". Oakridge National Laboratory, 1948.
- Gerald Goertzel,"Angular correlation of gamma rays". 1947.

== Patents ==
- U.S. patent T985005: Two-dimensional image data compression and decompression system.
- U.S. patent 4,725,815: Method for encoding and decoding a digital image.
- U.S. patent 4,286,329: Complex character generator.
- U.S. patent 4,654,721: System for reproducing multi-level digital images on a bi-level printer.
- U.S. patent 4,646,356: Method for converting a bit map of an image to a run length or run.
- U.S. patent 4,627,020: Method for rotating a binary image.
- U.S. patent 3,326,203: Infant Incubators.
- U.S. patent 4,633,490: Symmetrical optimized adaptive data compression/transfer/decompression system.
- U.S. patent 4,791,403: Log encoder/decoder system.
- U.S. patent 2,526,825: Fluid Selecting Apparatus.
- U.S. patent 4,631,751: Method for enlarging a binary image.
- U.S. patent 4,672,539: File compressor.
- U.S. patent 4,028,667: Asynchronous, hierarchical loop communication system with independent local.
