= Christian Reinsch =

German mathematician

- Born: 1934; Chemnitz
- Died: October 8, 2022 (aged 88)
- Education: Technical University of Munich
- Scientific career
- Fields: mathematics

Christian Reinsch (1934 – October 8, 2022) was a German mathematician who worked in the area of numerical analysis.

Reinsch began studying physics in 1953 at the Technical University of Munich, graduating in 1958. He received his doctorate in 1961 studying under Heinz Maier-Leibnitz.

Among other things, he worked in the area of numerical linear algebra and interpolation with spline functions. Several of his works have over two thousand citations each. Reinsch died on October 8, 2022.

== Selected works ==
- Wilkinson, John H.; Reinsch, C. (23 August 2014). Handbook for Automatic Computation. Springer. ISBN 978-3-642-86942-6.
- Golub, G. H.; Reinsch, C. (1970). "Singular value decomposition and least squares solutions" (PDF). Numerische Mathematik. 14 (5). Springer Science and Business Media LLC: 403–420. doi:10.1007/bf02163027. ISSN 0029-599X. S2CID 123532178.
- Reinsch, Christian H. (1967). "Smoothing by spline functions". Numerische Mathematik. 10 (3). Springer Science and Business Media LLC: 177–183. doi:10.1007/bf02162161. ISSN 0029-599X. S2CID 26555189.
- Reinsch, Christian H. (1971). "Smoothing by spline functions. II". Numerische Mathematik. 16 (5). Springer Science and Business Media LLC: 451–454. doi:10.1007/bf02169154. ISSN 0029-599X. S2CID 189777664.
- DAUNER, HERBERT; REINSCH, CHRISTIAN H. (1989). "An Analysis of Two Algorithms for Shape-Preserving Cubic Spline Interpolation". IMA Journal of Numerical Analysis. 9 (3). Oxford University Press (OUP): 299–314. doi:10.1093/imanum/9.3.299. ISSN 0272-4979.

== See also ==
- Goertzel algorithm
- QR algorithm
- Singular value decomposition
- Smoothing spline
