= Bergman space =

In complex analysis, functional analysis and operator theory, a Bergman space, named after Stefan Bergman, is a function space of holomorphic functions in a domain D of the complex plane that are sufficiently well-behaved at the boundary and also absolutely integrable. Specifically, for 0 < p < ∞, the Bergman space A^{p}(D) is the space of all holomorphic functions $f$ in D for which the p-norm is finite:

$$\|f\|_{A^p(D)} := \left(\int_D |f(x+iy)|^p\,\mathrm dx\,\mathrm dy\right)^{1/p} < \infty.$$

The quantity $\|f\|_{A^p(D)}$ is called the norm of the function $f$; it is a true norm if $p \geq 1$, thus A^{p}(D) is the subspace of holomorphic functions of the space L^{p}(D). The Bergman spaces are Banach spaces for $0 < p < \infty$, which is a consequence of the following estimate that is valid on compact subsets K of D:
$$\sup_{z\in K} |f(z)| \leq C_K \|f\|_{L^p(D)}.$$
Convergence of a sequence of holomorphic functions in L^{p}(D) thus implies compact convergence, and so the limit function is also holomorphic.

If p = 2, then A^{p}(D) is a reproducing kernel Hilbert space, whose kernel is given by the Bergman kernel.

== Special cases and generalisations ==
If the domain D is bounded, then the norm is often given by:

$$\|f\|_{A^p(D)} := \left(\int_D |f(z)|^p\,dA\right)^{1/p} \; \; \; \; \; (f \in A^p(D)),$$

where $A$ is a normalised Lebesgue measure of the complex plane, i.e. dA = dz/Area(D). Alternatively dA = dz/π is used, regardless of the area of D. The Bergman space is usually defined on the open unit disk $\mathbb{D}$ of the complex plane, in which case $A^p(\mathbb{D}):=A^p$. If $p=2$, given an element $f(z)= \sum_{n=0}^\infty a_n z^n \in A^2$, we have

$$\|f\|^2_{A^2} := \frac{1}{\pi} \int_\mathbb{D} |f(z)|^2 \, dz = \sum_{n=0}^\infty \frac{|a_n|^2}{n+1},$$

that is, A^{2} is isometrically isomorphic to the weighted ℓ^{p}(1/(n + 1)) space. In particular, not only are the polynomials dense in A^{2}, but every function $f \in A^2$ can be uniformly approximated by radial dilations of functions $g$ holomorphic on a disk $D_R(0)$, where $R > 1$ and the radial dilation of a function is defined by $g_r(z) := g(rz)$ for $0 < r < 1$.

Similarly, if D = $\mathbb{C}$_{+}, the right (or the upper) complex half-plane, then:

$$\|F\|^2_{A^2(\mathbb{C}_+)} := \frac{1}{\pi} \int_{\mathbb{C}_+} |F(z)|^2 \, dz = \int_0^\infty |f(t)|^2\frac{dt}{t},$$

where $F(z)= \int_0^\infty f(t)e^{-tz} \, dt$, that is, $A^2(\mathbb{C}_+)$ is isometrically isomorphic to the weighted L^{p}_{1/t} (0,∞) space (via the Laplace transform).

The weighted Bergman space A^{p}(D) is defined in an analogous way, i.e.,

$$\|f\|_{A^p_w (D)} := \left( \int_D |f(x+iy)|^2 \, w(x+iy) \, dx \, dy \right)^{1/p},$$

provided that w : D → [0, ∞) is chosen in such way, that $A^p_w(D)$ is a Banach space (or a Hilbert space, if p = 2). In case where $D= \mathbb{D}$, by a weighted Bergman space $A^p_\alpha$ we mean the space of all analytic functions f such that:

$$\|f\|_{A^p_\alpha} := \left( (\alpha+1)\int_\mathbb{D} |f(z)|^p \, (1-|z|^2)^\alpha dA(z) \right)^{1/p} < \infty,$$

and similarly on the right half-plane (i.e., $A^p_\alpha(\mathbb{C}_+)$) we have:

$$\|f\|_{A^p_\alpha(\mathbb{C}_+)} := \left( \frac{1}{\pi}\int_{\mathbb{C}_+} |f(x+iy)|^p x^\alpha \, dx \, dy \right)^{1/p},$$

and this space is isometrically isomorphic, via the Laplace transform, to the space $L^2(\mathbb{R}_+, \, d\mu_\alpha)$, where:

$$d\mu_\alpha := \frac{\Gamma(\alpha+1)}{2^\alpha t^{\alpha+1}} \, dt.$$

Here Γ denotes the Gamma function.

Further generalisations are sometimes considered, for example $A^2_\nu$ denotes a weighted Bergman space (often called a Zen space) with respect to a translation-invariant positive regular Borel measure $\nu$ on the closed right complex half-plane $\overline{\mathbb{C}_+}$, that is:

$$A^p_\nu := \left\{ f : \mathbb{C}_+ \longrightarrow \mathbb{C} \text{ analytic} \; : \; \|f\|_{A^p_\nu} := \left( \sup_{\varepsilon>0} \int_{\overline{\mathbb{C}_+}} |f(z+\varepsilon)|^p \, d\nu(z) \right)^{1/p} < \infty \right\}.$$

It is possible to generalise $A^2$ to the (weighted) Bergman space of vector-valued functions, defined by
$$A^{2}_\alpha(\mathbb{D}; \mathcal{H}) := \left\{\, f \colon \, \mathbb{D} \to \mathcal{H} \; | \;f \text{ analytic and } \|f\|_{2, \alpha} < +\infty  \right\},$$
and the norm on this space is given as
$$\|f\|_{2, \alpha} = \left(\int_{\mathbb{D}} \|f(z)\|_{\mathcal{H}}^2d\mu_\alpha(z)\right)^{\frac{1}{2}}.$$
The measure $\mu_\alpha$ is the same as the previous measure on the weighted Bergman space over the unit disk, $\mathcal{H}$ is a Hilbert space. In this case, the space is a Banach space for $0 < p \leq \infty$ and a (reproducing kernel) Hilbert space when $p=2$.

== Reproducing kernels ==
The reproducing kernel $k_z^{A^2}$ of A^{2} at point $z \in \mathbb{D}$ is given by:

$$k_z^{A^2}(\zeta)=\frac{1}{(1-\overline{z}\zeta)^2} \; \; \; \; \; (\zeta \in \mathbb{D}),$$

and similarly, for $A^2(\mathbb{C}_+)$ we have:

$$k_z^{A^2(\mathbb{C}_+)}(\zeta)=\frac{1}{(\overline{z}+\zeta)^2} \; \; \; \; \; (\zeta \in \mathbb{C}_+),$$

In general, if $\varphi$ maps a domain $\Omega$ conformally onto a domain $D$, then:

$$k^{A^2(\Omega)}_z (\zeta) = k^{\mathcal{A}^2(D)}_{\varphi(z)}(\varphi(\zeta)) \, \overline{\varphi'(z)}\varphi'(\zeta) \; \; \; \; \; (z, \zeta \in \Omega).$$

In weighted case we have:

$$k_z^{A^2_\alpha} (\zeta) = \frac{\alpha+1}{(1-\overline{z}\zeta)^{\alpha+2}} \; \; \; \; \; (z, \zeta \in \mathbb{D}),$$

and:

$$k_z^{A^2_\alpha(\mathbb{C}_+)} (\zeta) = \frac{2^\alpha(\alpha+1)}{(\overline{z}+\zeta)^{\alpha+2}} \; \; \; \; \; (z, \zeta \in \mathbb{C}_+).$$

In any reproducing kernel Bergman space, functions obey a certain property. It is called the reproducing property. This is expressed as a formula as follows: For any function $f \in A^2$ (respectively other Bergman spaces that are RKHS), it is true that
$$f(z) = \langle f, k_z^{A^2} \rangle_{2} = \int_{\mathbb{D}} \frac{f(\zeta)}{(1-z\overline{\zeta})^2}dA.$$

== See also ==
- Hilbert space
- Hardy space
- Dirichlet space
