= Aleksandrov–Clark measure =

In mathematics, Aleksandrov–Clark (AC) measures are specially constructed measures named after the two mathematicians, A. B. Aleksandrov and Douglas Clark, who discovered some of their deepest properties. The measures are also called either Aleksandrov measures, Clark measures, or occasionally spectral measures.

AC measures are used to extract information about self-maps of the unit disc, and have applications in a number of areas of complex analysis, most notably those related to operator theory. Systems of AC measures have also been constructed for higher dimensions, and for the half-plane.

== Construction of the measures ==
The original construction of Clark relates to one-dimensional perturbations of compressed shift operators on subspaces of the Hardy space:

$$H^2(\mathbb{D},\mathbb{C}).$$

By virtue of Beurling's theorem, any shift-invariant subspace of this space is of the form

$$\theta H^2(\mathbb{D},\mathbb{C}),$$

where $\theta$ is an inner function. As such, any invariant subspace of the adjoint of the shift is of the form

$$K_\theta = \left(\theta H^2(\mathbb{D},\mathbb{C})\right)^\perp.$$

We now define $S_\theta$ to be the shift operator compressed to $K_\theta$, that is

$$S_\theta = P_{K_\theta} S|_{K_\theta}.$$

Clark noticed that all the one-dimensional perturbations of $S_\theta$, which were also unitary maps, were of the form

$$U_\alpha (f) = S_\theta (f) + \alpha \left\langle f , \frac{\theta}{z} \right\rangle,$$

and related each such map to a measure, $\sigma_\alpha$ on the unit circle, via the Spectral theorem. This collection of measures, one for each $\alpha$ on the unit circle $^\mathbb{T}$, is then called the collection of AC measures associated with $\theta$.

== An alternative construction ==
The collection of measures may also be constructed for any analytic function (that is, not necessarily an inner function). Given an analytic self map, $\phi$, of the unit disc, $^\mathbb{D}$, we can construct a collection of functions, $u_\alpha$, given by

$$u_\alpha(z) = \Re \left(\frac{\alpha + \varphi(z)}{\alpha - \varphi(z)}\right),$$

one for each $^{\alpha\in\mathbb{T}}$. Each of these functions is positive and harmonic, so by Herglotz' Theorem each is the Poisson integral of some positive measure $\mu_\alpha$ on $^\mathbb{T}$. This collection is the set of AC measures associated with $\varphi$. It can be shown that the two definitions coincide for inner functions.
