= Quasinormal operator =

In operator theory, quasinormal operators is a class of bounded operators defined by weakening the requirements of a normal operator.

Every quasinormal operator is a subnormal operator. Every quasinormal operator on a finite-dimensional Hilbert space is normal.

== Definition and some properties ==
=== Definition ===
Let A be a bounded operator on a Hilbert space H, then A is said to be quasinormal if A commutes with A*A, i.e.

$$A(A^*A) = (A^*A) A.\,$$

=== Properties ===
A normal operator is necessarily quasinormal.

Let A = UP be the polar decomposition of A. If A is quasinormal, then UP = PU. To see this, notice that the positive factor P in the polar decomposition is of the form (A*A)^{1/2}, the unique positive square root of A*A. Quasinormality means A commutes with A*A. As a consequence of the continuous functional calculus for self-adjoint operators, A commutes with P = (A*A)^{1/2} also, i.e.

$$U P P = P U P.\,$$

So UP = PU on the range of P. On the other hand, if h ∈ H lies in kernel of P, clearly UP h = 0. But PU h = 0 as well. because U is a partial isometry whose initial space is closure of range P. Finally, the self-adjointness of P implies that H is the direct sum of its range and kernel. Thus the argument given proves UP = PU on all of H.

On the other hand, one can readily verify that if UP = PU, then A must be quasinormal. Thus the operator A is quasinormal if and only if UP = PU.

When H is finite dimensional, every quasinormal operator A is normal. This is because that in the finite dimensional case, the partial isometry U in the polar decomposition A = UP can be taken to be unitary. This then gives

$$A^*A = (UP)^* UP =  PU (PU)^* = AA^*.\,$$

In general, a partial isometry may not be extendable to a unitary operator and therefore a quasinormal operator need not be normal. For example, consider the unilateral shift T. T is quasinormal because T*T is the identity operator. But T is clearly not normal.

== Quasinormal invariant subspaces ==
It is not known that, in general, whether a bounded operator A on a Hilbert space H has a nontrivial invariant subspace. However, when A is normal, an affirmative answer is given by the spectral theorem. Every normal operator A is obtained by integrating the identity function with respect to a spectral measure E = {E_{B}} on the spectrum of A, σ(A):

$$A = \int_{\sigma(A)} \lambda \, dE (\lambda).\,$$

For any Borel set B ⊂ σ(A), the projection E_{B} commutes with A and therefore the range of E_{B} is an invariant subspace of A.

The above can be extended directly to quasinormal operators. To say A commutes with A*A is to say that A commutes with (A*A)^{1/2}. But this implies that A commutes with any projection E_{B} in the spectral measure of (A*A)^{1/2}, which proves the invariant subspace claim. In fact, one can conclude something stronger. The range of E_{B} is actually a reducing subspace of A, i.e. its orthogonal complement is also invariant under A.
