= Beurling–Lax theorem =

Theorem in mathematics

In mathematics, the Beurling–Lax theorem is a theorem due to Beurling (1948) and Lax (1959) which characterizes the shift-invariant subspaces of the Hardy space $H^2(\mathbb{D},\mathbb{C})$. It states that each such space is of the form

$$\theta H^2(\mathbb{D},\mathbb{C}),$$

for some inner function $\theta$.

The result is a significant connection between operator theory with complex analysis.

== See also ==
- Hardy space
- H^{2}
- Unilateral shift operator
