= Unilateral shift operator =

Operator on a Hilbert space that shifts basis vectors

In operator theory, the unilateral shift is a one-sided shift operator, that is, a shift operator acting on one-sided sequences or shift spaces. The term "operator" is used to draw contrast to finite-dimensional shift matrices. The term "unilateral" draws a distinction to the bilateral shift operator, of which the Baker's map is an example.

Shift operators are commonly studied in the context of measure-preserving dynamical systems. In such general settings, the unilateral shift operator is usually called the transfer operator or the Frobenius-Peron operator; its inverse is the Koopman operator. The properties of shift operators depend very strongly on the topology of the spaces on which they act; for example, the Bernoulli shift famously has a discrete spectrum given by the Bernoulli polynomials when acting on the space of bounded smooth functions on the unit interval, but has a continuous spectrum (on the unit disk), when acting on the Hilbert space of square-integrable functions. When acting on a measure space, the eigenfunctions of shift operators are characteristically fractal in shape, often differentiable-nowhere or even continuous-nowhere. Eigenvalues on the unit circle are associated with unitary time evolution, while those inside the unit disk are conventionally identified with decaying modes in statistical systems. In quantum mechanics, the prototypical unilateral shift operator is the annihilation operator of the quantum harmonic oscillator; it's eigenfunctions correspond to coherent states.

This article deals primarily with unilateral shifts acting on Hilbert space, specifically in two representations: as an operator on the sequence space $\ell^2$, or as a multiplication operator on a Hardy space. Its properties, particularly its invariant subspaces, are well-understood and serve as a model for more general theories.

== Definition ==
Let $\ell^2$ be the Hilbert space of square-summable sequences of complex numbers, i.e.,
$$\ell^2 = \left\{ (a_0, a_1, a_2, \dots) : a_n \in \mathbb{C} \text{ and } \sum_{n=0}^\infty |a_n|^2 < \infty \right\}$$
The unilateral shift is the linear operator $S: \ell^2 \to \ell^2$ defined by:
$$S(a_0, a_1, a_2, \dots) = (0, a_0, a_1, a_2, \dots)$$
This operator is also called the forward shift.

With respect to the standard orthonormal basis $(e_n)_{n=0}^\infty$ for $\ell^2$, where $e_n$ is the sequence with a 1 in the n-th position and 0 elsewhere, the action of $S$ is $Se_n = e_{n+1}$. Its matrix representation is:
$$S =
\begin{bmatrix}
0 & 0 & 0 & 0 & \cdots \\
1 & 0 & 0 & 0 & \cdots \\
0 & 1 & 0 & 0 & \cdots \\
0 & 0 & 1 & 0 & \cdots \\
\vdots & \vdots & \vdots & \vdots & \ddots
\end{bmatrix}$$
This is a Toeplitz operator whose symbol is the function $f(z) = z$. It can be regarded as an infinite-dimensional lower shift matrix.

== Properties ==
=== Adjoint operator ===
The adjoint of the unilateral shift, denoted $S^*$, is the backward shift. It acts on $\ell^2$ as:
$$S^*(b_0, b_1, b_2, b_3, \dots) = (b_1, b_2, b_3, \dots)$$
The matrix representation of $S^*$ is the conjugate transpose of the matrix for $S$:
$$S^* =
\begin{bmatrix}
0 & 1 & 0 & 0 & \cdots \\
0 & 0 & 1 & 0 & \cdots \\
0 & 0 & 0 & 1 & \cdots \\
0 & 0 & 0 & 0 & \cdots \\
\vdots & \vdots & \vdots & \vdots & \ddots
\end{bmatrix}$$
It can be regarded as an infinite-dimensional upper shift matrix.

=== Basic properties ===
- $S, S^*$ are both continuous but not compact.
- $S^*S = I$.
- $S, S^*$ make up a pair of unitary equivalence between $\ell^2$ and the set of $\ell^2$-sequences whose first element is zero.

The resolvent operator has matrix representation
$$(zI - S)^{-1} =
\begin{bmatrix}
z^{-1} & 0 & 0 & 0 & \cdots \\
z^{-2} & z^{-1} & 0 & 0 & \cdots \\
z^{-3} & z^{-2} & z^{-1} & 0 & \cdots \\
z^{-4} & z^{-3} & z^{-2} & z^{-1} & \cdots \\
\vdots & \vdots & \vdots & \vdots & \ddots
\end{bmatrix}$$
which is bounded iff $|z| > 1$. Similarly, $(zI - S^*)^{-1} = ((z^*I - S)^{-1})^*$.

For any $z \in \C, a \in \ell^2$ with $\|a \| = 1$,
$$\|(zI - S) a\|^2 = 1 + |z|^2 - 2 \Re (\langle Sa, a \rangle z), \quad \|(zI - S^*) a\|^2 = 1-|a_0|^2 + |z|^2 - 2 \Re (\langle Sa, a \rangle z^*)$$
where $\Re$ is the real part.

=== Spectral theory ===
Spectrum of the forward shift—Let $\mathbb{D}$ be the open unit disk, $\overline{\mathbb{D}}$ the closed unit disk, and $\mathbb{T}$ the unit circle.

- The spectrum of $S$ is $\sigma(S) = \overline{\mathbb{D}}$.
- The point spectrum of $S$ is empty: $\sigma_p(S) = \emptyset$.
- The approximate point spectrum of $S$ is the unit circle: $\sigma_{ap}(S) = \mathbb{T}$.
Proof

To show $\sigma(S) = \overline{\mathbb{D}}$, use the matrix representation of $(zI-S)^{-1}$, and note that it is bounded iff $|z| > 1$. To show $\sigma_p(S) = \emptyset$, directly show that $S a = \lambda a$ implies $a = 0$.

To show $\sigma_{ap}(S) = \mathbb T$, note that $\|(zI - S) a\|^2 \geq 1 + |z|^2 - 2|z| = (1-|z|)^2$ for any $z \in \C, a \in \ell^2$ with $\|a \| = 1$, so $\sigma_{ap}(S) \subset \overline{\mathbb{D}} \setminus \mathbb D = \mathbb T$. Conversely, for any $z \in \mathbb T$, construct the following unit vector
$$a = \frac{1}{\sqrt N}(1, z^{-1}, z^{-2}, \dots, z^{-(N-1)}, 0, 0, \dots)$$
then $\|(zI - S) a\|^2 = 2/N$, which converges to 0 at $N \to \infty$.

The spectral properties of $S^*$ differ significantly from those of $S$:

- $\sigma(S^*) = \overline{\mathbb{D}}$ (since $\sigma(A^*) = \overline{\sigma(A)}$).
- The point spectrum $\sigma_p(S^*)$ is the entire open unit disk $\mathbb{D}$. For any $\lambda \in \mathbb{D}$, the corresponding eigenvector is the geometric sequence $(1, \lambda, \lambda^2, \lambda^3, \dots)$.
- The approximate point spectrum $\sigma_{ap}(S^*)$ is the entire closed unit disk $\overline{\mathbb{D}}$. To show this, it remains to show $\mathbb T \subset \sigma_{ap}(S^*)$, which can be proven by a similar construction as before, using $a = \frac{1}{\sqrt N}(1, z^{1}, z^{2}, \dots, z^{(N-1)}, 0, 0, \dots)$.

== Hardy space model ==
The unilateral shift can be studied using complex analysis.

Define the Hardy space $H^2$ as the Hilbert space of analytic functions $f(z) = \sum_{n=0}^\infty a_n z^n$ on the open unit disk $\mathbb{D}$ for which the sequence of coefficients $(a_n)$ is in $\ell^2$.

Define the multiplication operator $M_z$ on $H^2$:
$$(M_z f)(z) = zf(z)$$
then $S$ and $M_z$ are unitarily equivalent via the unitary map $U: \ell^2 \to H^2$ defined by
$$U(a_0, a_1, a_2, \dots) = \sum_{n=0}^\infty a_n z^n$$
which gives $U^* M_z U = S$. Using this unitary equivalence, it is common in the literature to use $S$ to denote $M_z$ and to treat $H^2$ as the primary setting for the unilateral shift.

=== Commutant ===
The commutant of an operator $A$, denoted $\{A\}'$, is the algebra of all bounded operators that commute with $A$. The commutant of the unilateral shift is the algebra of multiplication operators on $H^2$ by bounded analytic functions.
$$\{S\}' = \{M_\varphi : \varphi \in H^\infty\}$$
Here, $H^\infty$ is the space of bounded analytic functions on $\mathbb{D}$, and $(M_\varphi f)(z) = \varphi(z)f(z)$.

=== Cyclic vectors ===
A vector $x$ is a cyclic vector for an operator $A$ if the linear span of its orbit $\{A^n x : n \ge 0\}$ is dense in the space. We have:

- For the unilateral shift $S$ on $H^2$, the cyclic vectors are the outer functions.
- A function $f \in H^2$ that has a zero in the open unit disk $\mathbb{D}$ is not a cyclic vector. This is because every function in the span of its orbit will also be zero at that point, so the subspace cannot be dense.
- A function $f \in H^2$ that is bounded away from zero (i.e., $\inf_{z \in \mathbb{D}} |f(z)| > 0$) is a cyclic vector.
- A function $f \in H^2$, that is in the open unit disk $\mathbb{D}$ is nonzero but $\inf_{z \in \mathbb{D}} |f(z)| = 0$, may or may not be cyclic. For example, $f(z) = 1-z$ is a cyclic vector.

The cyclic vectors are precisely the outer functions.

=== Lattice of invariant subspaces ===
The $S$-invariant subspaces of $H^2$ are completely characterized analytically. Specifically, they are precisely $M_u(H^2)$ where $u$ is an inner function.

The $S$-invariant subspaces make up a lattice of subspaces. The two lattice operators, join and meet, correspond to operations on inner functions.

Given two invariant subspaces $M_u(H^2), M_v(H^2)$, we have $M_u(H^2) \subset M_v(H^2)$ iff $u/v \in H^2$.

== See also ==
- Bilateral shift
- Operator theory
- Beurling's theorem
- Clock and shift matrices
- Composition operator
- Multiplication operator
