= Alexei Borisovich Aleksandrov =

Russian mathematician

Alexei Borisovich Aleksandrov, (Алексей Борисович Александров, born 23 December 1954) is a Russian mathematician, specializing in mathematical analysis.

Aleksandrov received in 1979 his Russian candidate degree (Ph.D.) from the Leningrad State University under Victor Havin with thesis Hardy Classes H^{p} for p∈(0,1) (Rational Approximation, Backward Shift Operator, Cauchy-Stieltjes Type Integral (title translated from the Russian). In 1984 he received his Russian doctorate (higher doctoral degree) and is now a professor at the Steklov Institute of Mathematics.

His research deals with, among other topics, function theory in the unit ball, Hardy spaces, shift operators, and Hadamard gap series.

In 1982 he received the Salem Prize. In 1986 he was an Invited Speaker at the ICM in Berkeley, California.

== Selected publications ==
(with English translations of Russian titles)

- Gap series and pseudocontinuations. An arithmetic approach, Algebra i Analiz, vol. 9, 1997, pp. 3–31
- Function theory in the ball, Itogi Nauki i Tekhniki. Ser. Sovrem. Probl. Mat. Fund. Napr., vol. 8, 1985, pp. 115–190
- Inner functions on compact spaces, Functional Analysis and Applications, vol. 18, 1984, pp. 1-13
- The existence of inner functions in the ball, Mat. Sbornik, vol. 118, 1982, pp. 147–163
- Spectral subspaces of L^{p} for p < 1, Algebra i Analiz, tom 19 (2007), nomer 3. trans. in: St. Petersburg Math. J. vol. 19, 2008, pp. 327–374 doi:10.1090/S1061-0022-08-01001-7
- with V. V. Peller: Functions of perturbed dissipative operators, Algebra i Analiz, tom 23 (2011), nomer 2. trans. in: St. Petersburg Math. J. vol. 23, 2012, pp. 209–238 doi:10.1090/S1061-0022-2012-01194-5

== See also ==
- Aleksandrov-Clark measure
