= Hyponormal operator =

Generalized normal operator

In mathematics, especially operator theory, a hyponormal operator is a generalization of a normal operator. In general, a bounded linear operator T on a complex Hilbert space H is said to be p-hyponormal ($0 < p \le 1$) if:

$$(T^*T)^p \ge (TT^*)^p$$

(That is to say, $(T^*T)^p - (TT^*)^p$ is a positive operator.) If $p = 1$, then T is called a hyponormal operator. If $p = 1/2$, then T is called a semi-hyponormal operator. Moreover, T is said to be log-hyponormal if it is invertible and

$$\log (T^*T) \ge \log (TT^*).$$

An invertible p-hyponormal operator is log-hyponormal. On the other hand, not every log-hyponormal is p-hyponormal.

The class of semi-hyponormal operators was introduced by Xia, and the class of p-hyponormal operators was studied by Aluthge, who used what is today called the Aluthge transformation.

Every subnormal operator (in particular, a normal operator) is hyponormal, and every hyponormal operator is a paranormal convexoid operator. Not every paranormal operator is, however, hyponormal.
