= Left shift =

Left shift may refer to:

- Left shift (medicine), a medical term similar to blood shift
- Logical left shift, a computer operation
- Arithmetic left shift, a computer operation
- Shift operator § Sequences, a linear operator in functional analysis
  - Shift matrix, the finite-dimensional analogue
- Left Shift key, a key on a computer keyboard
- Left Shift (political group) (aka Linksruck), a former Trotskyist group in Germany
- Left shift (quality assurance), thinking about quality earlier in the product development lifecycle

== See also ==
- Right shift (disambiguation)
