= Normal operator =

(on a complex Hilbert space) continuous linear operator

In mathematics, especially functional analysis, a normal operator on a complex Hilbert space $H$ is a continuous linear operator $N\colon H\rightarrow H$ that commutes with its Hermitian adjoint $N^{\ast}$, that is: $N^{\ast}N = NN^{\ast}$.

Normal operators are important because the spectral theorem holds for them. The class of normal operators is well understood. Examples of normal operators are

- unitary operators: $U^{\ast} = U^{-1}$
- Hermitian operators (i.e., self-adjoint operators): $N^{\ast} = N$
- skew-Hermitian operators: $N^{\ast} = -N$
- positive operators: $N = M^{\ast}M$ for some $M$ (so N is self-adjoint).

A normal matrix is the matrix expression of a normal operator on the Hilbert space $\mathbb{C}^{n}$.

== Properties ==
Normal operators are characterized by the spectral theorem. A compact normal operator (in particular, a normal operator on a finite-dimensional inner product space) is unitarily diagonalizable.

Let $T$ be a bounded operator. The following are equivalent.

- $T$ is normal.
- $T^{\ast}$ is normal.
- $\|T x\| = \|T^{\ast} x\|$ for all $x$ (use $\|Tx\|^2 = \langle T^{\ast} Tx, x \rangle = \langle T T^*x, x \rangle = \|T^{\ast}x\|^2$).
- The self-adjoint and anti–self adjoint parts of $T$ commute. That is, if $T$ is written as $T = T_1 + i T_2$ with $T_1 := \frac{T+T^*}{2}$ and $i\,T_2 := \frac{T-T^*}{2},$ then $T_1 T_2 = T_2 T_1.$ (Note: In contrast, for the important class of Creation and annihilation operators of, e.g., quantum field theory, they don't commute)

If $N$ is a bounded normal operator, then $N$ and $N^*$ have the same kernel and the same range. Consequently, the range of $N$ is dense if and only if $N$ is injective. Put in another way, the kernel of a normal operator is the orthogonal complement of its range. It follows that the kernel of the operator $N^k$ coincides with that of $N$ for any $k.$ Every generalized eigenvalue of a normal operator is thus genuine. $\lambda$ is an eigenvalue of a normal operator $N$ if and only if its complex conjugate $\overline{\lambda}$ is an eigenvalue of $N^*.$ Eigenvectors of a normal operator corresponding to different eigenvalues are orthogonal, and a normal operator stabilizes the orthogonal complement of each of its eigenspaces. This implies the usual spectral theorem: every normal operator on a finite-dimensional space is diagonalizable by a unitary operator. There is also an infinite-dimensional version of the spectral theorem expressed in terms of projection-valued measures. The residual spectrum of a normal operator is empty.

The product of normal operators that commute is again normal; this is nontrivial, but follows directly from Fuglede's theorem, which states (in a form generalized by Putnam):

If $N_1$ and $N_2$ are normal operators and if $A$ is a bounded linear operator such that $N_1 A = A N_2,$ then $N_1^* A = A N_2^*$.

The operator norm of a normal operator equals its numerical radius and spectral radius.

A normal operator coincides with its Aluthge transform.

== Properties in finite-dimensional case ==
If a normal operator T on a finite-dimensional real or complex Hilbert space (inner product space) H stabilizes a subspace V, then it also stabilizes its orthogonal complement V^{⊥}. (This statement is trivial in the case where T is self-adjoint.)

Proof. Let P_{V} be the orthogonal projection onto V. Then the orthogonal projection onto V^{⊥} is 1_{H}−P_{V}. The fact that T stabilizes V can be expressed as (1_{H}−P_{V})TP_{V} = 0, or TP_{V} = P_{V}TP_{V}. The goal is to show that P_{V}T(1_{H}−P_{V}) = 0.

Let X = P_{V}T(1_{H}−P_{V}). Since (A, B) ↦ tr(AB*) is an inner product on the space of endomorphisms of H, it is enough to show that tr(XX*) = 0. First it is noted that

$$\begin{align}
XX^* &= P_V T(\boldsymbol{1}_H - P_V)^2 T^* P_V \\
&= P_V T(\boldsymbol{1}_H - P_V) T^* P_V \\
&= P_V T T^* P_V - P_V T P_V T^* P_V.
\end {align}$$

Now using properties of the trace and of orthogonal projections we have:

$$\begin{align}
\operatorname{tr}(XX^*) &= \operatorname{tr} \left ( P_VTT^*P_V - P_VTP_VT^*P_V \right ) \\
&= \operatorname{tr}(P_VTT^*P_V) - \operatorname{tr}(P_VTP_VT^*P_V) \\
&= \operatorname{tr}(P_V^2TT^*) - \operatorname{tr}(P_V^2TP_VT^*) \\
&= \operatorname{tr}(P_VTT^*) - \operatorname{tr}(P_VTP_VT^*) \\
&= \operatorname{tr}(P_VTT^*) - \operatorname{tr}(TP_VT^*) && \text{using the hypothesis that } T \text{ stabilizes } V\\
&= \operatorname{tr}(P_VTT^*) - \operatorname{tr}(P_VT^*T) \\
&= \operatorname{tr}(P_V(TT^*-T^*T)) \\
&= 0.
\end{align}$$

The same argument goes through for compact normal operators in infinite dimensional Hilbert spaces, where one make use of the Hilbert-Schmidt inner product, defined by tr(AB*) suitably interpreted. However, for bounded normal operators, the orthogonal complement to a stable subspace may not be stable. It follows that the Hilbert space cannot in general be spanned by eigenvectors of a normal operator. Consider, for example, the bilateral shift (or two-sided shift) acting on $\ell^2(\mathbb{Z})$, which is normal, but has no eigenvalues.

The invariant subspaces of a shift acting on Hardy space are characterized by Beurling's theorem.

== Normal elements of algebras ==
The notion of normal operators generalizes to an involutive algebra:

An element $x$ of an involutive algebra is said to be normal if $x^{\ast}x = xx^{\ast}$.

Self-adjoint and unitary elements are normal.

The most important case is when such an algebra is a C*-algebra.

== Unbounded normal operators ==
The definition of normal operators naturally generalizes to some class of unbounded operators. Explicitly, a closed operator N is said to be normal if

$$N^*N = NN^*.$$

Here, the existence of the adjoint N* requires that the domain of N be dense, and the equality includes the assertion that the domain of N*N equals that of NN*, which is not necessarily the case in general.

Equivalently normal operators are precisely those for which

$$\|Nx\|=\|N^*x\|\qquad$$

with

$$\mathcal{D}(N)=\mathcal{D}(N^*).$$

The spectral theorem still holds for unbounded (normal) operators. The proofs work by reduction to bounded (normal) operators.

== Generalization ==
The success of the theory of normal operators led to several attempts for generalization by weakening the commutativity requirement. Classes of operators that include normal operators are (in order of inclusion)

- Hyponormal operators
- Normaloids
- Paranormal operators
- Quasinormal operators
- Subnormal operators

== See also ==
- Continuous linear operator – Function between topological vector spaces
- Contraction (operator theory) – Bounded operators with sub-unit norm
