= Greater-than sign =

Mathematical symbol for "greater than"

>o

Greater-than sign
- In Unicode: U+003E > GREATER-THAN SIGN (&gt;, &GT;)

Different from
- Different from: U+232A 〉 RIGHT-POINTING ANGLE BRACKET

Related
- See also: U+2265 ≥ GREATER-THAN OR EQUAL TO U+2A7E ⩾ GREATER-THAN OR SLANTED EQUAL TO U+226F ≯ NOT GREATER-THAN; U+226B ≫ MUCH GREATER-THAN

The greater-than sign is a mathematical symbol that denotes an inequality between two values. The widely adopted form of two equal-length strokes connecting in an acute angle at the right, >, has been found in documents dated as far back as 1631. In mathematical writing, the greater-than sign is typically placed between two values being compared and signifies that the first number is greater than the second number. Examples of typical usage include 1.5 > 1 and 1 > −2. The less-than sign and greater-than sign always "point" to the smaller number. Since the development of computer programming languages, the greater-than sign and the less-than sign have been repurposed for a range of uses and operations.

== History ==
The earliest known use of the symbols < and > is found in Artis Analyticae Praxis ad Aequationes Algebraicas Resolvendas (The Analytical Arts Applied to Solving Algebraic Equations) by Thomas Harriot, published posthumously in 1631. The text states "Signum majoritatis ut a > b significet a majorem quam b (The sign of majority a > b indicates that a is greater than b)" and "Signum minoritatis ut a < b significet a minorem quam b (The sign of minority a < b indicates that a is less than b)."

According to historian Art Johnson, while Harriot was surveying North America, he saw a Native American with a symbol that resembled the greater-than sign, in both backwards and forwards forms. Johnson says it is likely Harriot developed the two symbols from this symbol.

== Usage in text markup ==
=== Angle brackets ===
The greater-than sign is sometimes used for an approximation of the closing angle bracket, ⟩. The proper Unicode character is U+232A 〉 RIGHT-POINTING ANGLE BRACKET. ASCII does not have angular brackets.

=== HTML ===
In HTML (and SGML and XML), the greater-than sign is used at the end of tags. The greater-than sign may be included with &gt;, while &ge; produces the greater-than or equal to sign.

=== Quoting ===
In some e-mail systems, the greater-than sign is used to denote quotations. The sign is also used to denote quotations in Markdown.

The diple was a mark resembling a greater-than that was sometimes used to mark quotations.

== Usage in programming ==
The 'greater-than sign' > is encoded in ASCII as character hex 3E, decimal 62. The Unicode code point is U+003E > GREATER-THAN SIGN, inherited from ASCII.

For use with HTML, the mnemonics &gt; or &GT; may also be used.

=== Programming language ===
BASIC and C-family languages (including Java and C++) use the comparison operator > to mean "greater than". In Lisp-family languages, > is a function used to mean "greater than". In Coldfusion and Fortran, operator .GT. means "greater than".

=== Double greater-than sign ===
>> is used for an approximation of the much-greater-than sign ≫. ASCII does not have the much greater-than sign.

The double greater-than sign is also used for an approximation of the closing guillemet, ».

In Java, C, and C++, the operator >> is the right-shift operator. In C++ it is also used to get input from a stream, similar to the C functions getchar and fgets.

In Haskell, the >> function is a monadic operator. It is used for sequentially composing two actions, discarding any value produced by the first. In that regard, it is like the statement sequencing operator in imperative languages, such as the semicolon in C.

In XPath the >> operator returns true if the left operand follows the right operand in document order; otherwise it returns false.

=== Triple greater-than sign ===
>>> is the unsigned-right-shift operator in JavaScript. Three greater-than signs form the distinctive prompt of the firmware console in MicroVAX, VAXstation, and DEC Alpha computers (known as the SRM console in the latter). This is also the default prompt of the Python interactive shell, often seen for code examples that can be executed interactively in the interpreter:

$ python
Python 3.9.2 (default, Feb 20 2021, 18:40:11) 
[GCC 10.2.0] on linux
Type "help", "copyright", "credits" or "license" for more information.
>>> print("Hello World")
Hello World
>>>

=== Greater-than sign with equals sign ===
>= is sometimes used for an approximation of the greater than or equal to sign, ≥ which was not included in the ASCII repertoire. The sign is, however, provided in Unicode, as U+2265 ≥ GREATER-THAN OR EQUAL TO (&ge;, &geq;, &GreaterEqual;).

In BASIC, Lisp-family languages, Lua and C-family languages (including Java and C++) the operator >= means "greater than or equal to". In Sinclair BASIC it is encoded as a single-byte code point token.

In Fortran, the operator .GE. means "greater than or equal to".

In Bourne shell and Windows PowerShell, the operator -ge means "greater than or equal to".

=== Hyphen-minus with greater-than sign ===
-> is used in some programming languages (for example F#) to create an arrow. Arrows like these could also be used in text where other arrow symbols are unavailable. In the R programming language, this can be used as the right assignment operator. In the C, C++, and PHP, this is used as a member access operator. In Swift and Python, it is used to indicate the return value type when defining a function (i.e., func foo() -> MyClass {...}).

=== Shell scripts ===
In Bourne shell (and many other shells), greater-than sign is used to redirect output to a file. Greater-than plus ampersand (>&) is used to redirect to a file descriptor.

=== Spaceship operator ===
Greater-than sign is used in the 'spaceship operator', <=>.

=== ECMAScript and C# ===
In ECMAScript and C#, the greater-than sign is used in lambda function expressions.

In ECMAScript:

const square = x => x * x;
console.log(square(5)); // 25

In C#:

Func<int, int> square = x => x * x;
Console.WriteLine(square(5)); // 25

=== PHP ===
In PHP, the greater-than sign is used in conjunction with the less-than sign as a not equal to operator. It is the same as the != operator.

$x = 5;
$y = 3;
$z = 5;

echo $x <> $y; // true
echo $x <> $z; // false

== Unicode ==
Unicode provides various greater than symbols: (use ⇕ controls to change sort order temporarily)

| Symbol | Code Point | Unicode name |
|---|---|---|
| > | U+003E | Greater-Than Sign |
| ≥ | U+2265 | Greater-Than Or Equal To |
| ≧ | U+2267 | Greater-Than Over Equal To |
| ≩ | U+2269 | Greater-Than But Not Equal To |
| ≫ | U+226B | Much Greater-Than |
| ≯ | U+226F | Not Greater-Than |
| ≱ | U+2271 | Neither Greater-Than Nor Equal To |
| ≳ | U+2273 | Greater-Than Or Equivalent To |
| ≵ | U+2275 | Neither Greater-Than Nor Equivalent To |
| ⋗ | U+22D7 | |
| ⋙ | U+22D9 | Very Much Greater-Than |
| ⋝ | U+22DD | Equal To Or Greater-Than |
| ⋧ | U+22E7 | Greater-Than But Not Equivalent To |
| ⍄ | U+2344 | Apl Functional Symbol Quad Greater-Than |
| ⍩ | U+2369 | Apl Functional Symbol Greater-Than Diaeresis |
| ⦕ | U+2995 | Double Left Arc Greater-Than Bracket |
| ⥸ | U+2978 | Greater-Than Above Rightwards Arrow |
| ⧁ | U+29C1 | Circled Greater-Than |
| ⩺ | U+2A7A | Greater-Than With Circle Inside |
| ⪚ | U+2A9A | Double-Line Equal To Or Greater-Than |
| ⪜ | U+2A9C | Double-Line Slanted Equal To Or Greater-Than |
| ⩾ | U+2A7E | Greater-Than Or Slanted Equal To |
| ⪀ | U+2A80 | Greater-Than Or Slanted Equal To With Dot Inside |
| ⪂ | U+2A82 | Greater-Than Or Slanted Equal To With Dot Above |
| ⪄ | U+2A84 | Greater-Than Or Slanted Equal To With Dot Above Left |
| ⪆ | U+2A86 | Greater-Than Or Approximate |
| ⪎ | U+2A8E | Greater-Than Above Similar Or Equal |
| ⪊ | U+2A8A | Greater-Than And Not Approximate |
| ⪈ | U+2A88 | Greater-Than And Single-Line Not Equal To |
| ⪢ | U+2AA2 | Double Nested Greater-Than |
| ⪧ | U+2AA7 | Greater-Than Closed By Curve |
| ⪩ | U+2AA9 | Greater-Than Closed By Curve Above Slanted Equal |
| ⫺ | U+2AFA | Double-Line Slanted Greater-Than Or Equal To |
| ⩼ | U+2A7C | Greater-Than With Question Mark Above |
| ⦔ | U+2994 | Right Arc Greater-Than Bracket |
| ⪖ | U+2A96 | Slanted Equal To Or Greater-Than |
| ⪘ | U+2A98 | Slanted Equal To Or Greater-Than With Dot Inside |
| ⪞ | U+2A9E | Similar Or Greater-Than |
| ⪠ | U+2AA0 | Similar Above Greater-Than Above Equals Sign |
| ⫸ | U+2AF8 | Triple Nested Greater-Than |
| ﹥ | U+FE65 | Small greater than sign |
| ＞ | U+FF1E | Fullwidth greater than Sign |

== See also ==
- Inequality (mathematics)
- Less-than sign
- Relational operator
- Mathematical operators and symbols in Unicode
- Guillemet
- Material conditional
