= Generalizations of Pauli matrices =

Families of matrices in mathematics, physics, and quantum information

In mathematics and physics, in particular quantum information, the term generalized Pauli matrices refers to families of matrices which generalize the (linear algebraic) properties of the Pauli matrices. Here, a few classes of such matrices are summarized.

== Multi-qubit Pauli matrices (Hermitian) ==
This method of generalizing the Pauli matrices refers to a generalization from a single 2-level system (qubit) to multiple such systems. In particular, the generalized Pauli matrices for a group of $N$ qubits is just the set of matrices generated by all possible products of Pauli matrices on any of the qubits.

The vector space of a single qubit is $V_1 = \mathbb{C}^2$ and the vector space of $N$ qubits is $V_N = \left(\mathbb{C}^2\right)^{\otimes N}\cong \mathbb{C}^{2^N}$. We use the tensor product notation

$$\sigma_a^{(n)} = I^{(1)} \otimes \dotsm \otimes I^{(n-1)} \otimes \sigma_a \otimes I^{(n+1)} \otimes \dotsm \otimes I^{(N)}, \qquad a = 1, 2, 3$$

to refer to the operator on $V_N$ that acts as a Pauli matrix on the $n$th qubit and the identity on all other qubits. We can also use $a = 0$ for the identity, i.e., for any $n$ we use $\sigma_0^{(n)} = \bigotimes_{m=1}^N I^{(m)}$. Then the multi-qubit Pauli matrices are all matrices of the form

$$\sigma_{\,\vec a} := \prod_{n=1}^N \sigma_{a_n}^{(n)} = \sigma_{a_1} \otimes \dotsm \otimes \sigma_{a_N}, \qquad \vec{a} = (a_1, \ldots, a_N) \in \{0, 1, 2, 3\}^{\times N}$$,

i.e., for $\vec{a}$ a vector of integers between 0 and 4. Thus there are $4^N$ such generalized Pauli matrices if we include the identity $I = \bigotimes_{m=1}^N I^{(m)}$ and $4^N - 1$ if we do not.

=== Notations ===
In quantum computation, it is conventional to denote the Pauli matrices with single upper case letters

$$I \equiv \sigma_0, \qquad X \equiv \sigma_1, \qquad Y \equiv \sigma_2, \qquad Z \equiv \sigma_3.$$

This allows subscripts on Pauli matrices to indicate the qubit index. For example, in a system with 3 qubits,

$$X_1 \equiv X \otimes I \otimes I, \qquad Z_2 \equiv I \otimes Z \otimes I.$$

Multi-qubit Pauli matrices can be written as products of single-qubit Paulis on disjoint qubits. Alternatively, when it is clear from context, the tensor product symbol $\otimes$ can be omitted, i.e. unsubscripted Pauli matrices written consecutively represents tensor product rather than matrix product. For example:

$$XZI \equiv X_1Z_2 = X \otimes Z \otimes I.$$

== Higher spin matrices (Hermitian) ==
The traditional Pauli matrices are the matrix representation of the $\mathfrak{su}(2)$ Lie algebra generators $J_x$, $J_y$, and $J_z$ in the 2-dimensional irreducible representation of SU(2), corresponding to a spin-1/2 particle. These generate the Lie group SU(2).

For a general particle of spin $s=0,1/2,1,3/2,2,\ldots$, one instead utilizes the $2s+1$-dimensional irreducible representation.

== Generalized Gell-Mann matrices (Hermitian) ==
This method of generalizing the Pauli matrices refers to a generalization from 2-level systems (Pauli matrices acting on qubits) to 3-level systems (Gell-Mann matrices acting on qutrits) and generic $d$-level systems (generalized Gell-Mann matrices acting on qudits).

=== Construction ===
Let $E_{jk}$ be the matrix with 1 in the jk-th entry and 0 elsewhere. Consider the space of $d\times d$ complex matrices, $\Complex^{d\times d}$, for a fixed $d$.

Define the following matrices,

$$f_{k,j}^{\,\,\,\,\, d} =
\begin{cases}E_{kj} + E_{jk} & {\text{for }}k < j,\\
-i(E_{jk} - E_{kj})&{\text{for }} k > j.\end{cases}$$

and

$$h_{k}^{\,\,\, d} =
\begin{cases}I_d & {\text{for }} k = 1,\\
h_{k}^{\,\,\, d-1} \oplus 0 &{\text{for }} 1 < k < d, \\
\sqrt{\tfrac{2}{d(d - 1)}} \left( h_1^{d-1} \oplus (1 - d)\right) = \sqrt{\tfrac{2}{d(d - 1)}} \left( I_{d-1} \oplus (1 - d)\right) &{\text{for }} k = d
\end{cases}$$

The collection of matrices defined above without the identity matrix are called the generalized Gell-Mann matrices, in dimension $d$. The symbol ⊕ (utilized in the Cartan subalgebra above) means matrix direct sum.

The generalized Gell-Mann matrices are Hermitian and traceless by construction, just like the Pauli matrices. One can also check that they are orthogonal in the Hilbert–Schmidt inner product on $\Complex^{d\times d}$. By dimension count, one sees that they span the vector space of $d\times d$ complex matrices, $\mathfrak{gl}(d,\Complex)$. They then provide a Lie-algebra-generator basis acting on the fundamental representation of $\mathfrak{su}(d)$.

In dimensions $d$ = 2 and 3, the above construction recovers the Pauli and Gell-Mann matrices, respectively.

== Sylvester's generalized Pauli matrices (non-Hermitian) ==
A particularly notable generalization of the Pauli matrices was constructed by James Joseph Sylvester in 1882. These are known as "Weyl–Heisenberg matrices" as well as "generalized Pauli matrices".

=== Framing ===
The Pauli matrices $\sigma _1$ and $\sigma _3$ satisfy the following:

$$\sigma_1^2 = \sigma_3^2 = I, \quad \sigma_1 \sigma_3 = - \sigma_3 \sigma_1 = e^{\pi i} \sigma_3 \sigma_1.$$

The so-called Walsh–Hadamard conjugation matrix is

$$W = \frac{1}{\sqrt{2}}
\begin{bmatrix}
1 & 1 \\ 1 & -1
\end{bmatrix}.$$

Like the Pauli matrices, $W$ is both Hermitian and unitary. $\sigma_1, \; \sigma_3$ and $W$ satisfy the relation

$$\; \sigma_1 = W \sigma_3 W^* .$$

The goal now is to extend the above to higher dimensions, $d$.

=== Construction: The clock and shift matrices ===
Fix the dimension $d$ as before. Let $\omega = \exp(2 \pi i / d)$, a root of unity. Since $\omega^d = 1$ and $\omega \neq 1$, the sum of all roots annuls:

$$1 + \omega + \cdots + \omega ^{d-1} = 0 .$$

Integer indices may then be cyclically identified mod d.

Now define, with Sylvester, the shift matrix

$$\Sigma _1 =
\begin{bmatrix}
0      & 0      & 0      & \cdots & 0     & 1\\
1      & 0      & 0      & \cdots & 0     & 0\\
0      & 1      & 0      & \cdots & 0     & 0\\
0      & 0      & 1      & \cdots & 0     & 0\\
\vdots & \vdots & \vdots & \ddots &\vdots &\vdots\\
0      & 0      & 0      & \cdots & 1     & 0\\
\end{bmatrix}$$

and the clock matrix

$$\Sigma _3 =
\begin{bmatrix}
1      & 0      & 0        & \cdots & 0\\
0      & \omega & 0        & \cdots & 0\\
0      & 0      & \omega^2 & \cdots & 0\\
\vdots & \vdots & \vdots   & \ddots & \vdots\\
0      & 0      & 0        & \cdots & \omega^{d-1}
\end{bmatrix}.$$

These matrices generalize $\sigma_1$ and $\sigma_3$, respectively.

Note that the unitarity and tracelessness of the two Pauli matrices is preserved, but not Hermiticity in dimensions higher than two. Since Pauli matrices describe quaternions, in 1884 Sylvester dubbed the higher-dimensional analogs "nonions", "sedenions", etc.

These two matrices are also the cornerstone of quantum mechanical dynamics in finite-dimensional vector spaces as formulated by Hermann Weyl, and they find routine applications in numerous areas of mathematical physics. The clock matrix amounts to the exponential of position in a "clock" of $d$ hours, and the shift matrix is just the translation operator (a cyclic permutation matrix) in that cyclic vector space, so the exponential of the momentum. They are (finite-dimensional) representations of the corresponding elements of the Weyl–Heisenberg group on a $d$-dimensional Hilbert space.

The following relations echo and generalize those of the Pauli matrices:

$$\Sigma_1^d = \Sigma_3^d = I$$

and the braiding relation,

$$\Sigma_3 \Sigma_1 = \omega \Sigma_1 \Sigma_3 = e^{2\pi i / d} \Sigma_1 \Sigma_3 ,$$

the Weyl formulation of the CCR, and can be rewritten as

$$\Sigma_3 \Sigma_1 \Sigma_3^{d-1} \Sigma_1^{d-1} = \omega ~.$$

On the other hand, to generalize the Walsh–Hadamard matrix $W$, note

$$W = \frac{1}{\sqrt{2}}
\begin{bmatrix}
1 & 1 \\ 1 & \omega^{2-1}
\end{bmatrix}
=
\frac{1}{\sqrt{2}}
\begin{bmatrix}
1 & 1 \\ 1 & \omega^{d-1}
\end{bmatrix}.$$

Define, again with Sylvester, the following analog matrix, still denoted by $W$ in a slight abuse of notation,

$$W =
\frac{1}{\sqrt{d}}
\begin{bmatrix}
1      & 1            & 1               & \cdots & 1\\
1      & \omega^{d-1} & \omega^{2(d-1)} & \cdots & \omega^{(d-1)^2}\\
1      & \omega^{d-2} & \omega^{2(d-2)} & \cdots & \omega^{(d-1)(d-2)}\\
\vdots & \vdots       & \vdots          & \ddots & \vdots\\
1      & \omega       & \omega ^2       & \cdots & \omega^{d-1}
\end{bmatrix}~.$$

It is evident that $W$ is no longer Hermitian, but is still unitary. Direct calculation yields

$$\Sigma_1 = W \Sigma_3 W^* ~,$$

which is the desired analog result. Thus, $W$, a Vandermonde matrix, arrays the eigenvectors of $\Sigma_1$, which has the same eigenvalues as $\Sigma_3$.

When $d = 2^k$, $W^*$ is precisely the discrete Fourier transform matrix, converting position coordinates to momentum coordinates and vice versa.

=== Definition ===
The complete family of $d^2$ unitary (but non-Hermitian) independent matrices $\{\sigma_{k,j}\}_{k,j=1}^d$ is defined as follows:

$\sigma_{k,j}:= \left(\Sigma_1\right)^k \left(\Sigma_3\right)^j = \sum_{m=0}^{d-1} |m+k\rangle \omega^{jm} \langle m|.$

This provides Sylvester's well-known trace-orthogonal basis for $\mathfrak{gl}(d,\Complex)$, known as "nonions" $\mathfrak{gl}(3,\Complex)$, "sedenions" $\mathfrak{gl}(4,\Complex)$, etc...

This basis can be systematically connected to the above Hermitian basis. (For instance, the powers of $\Sigma_3$, the Cartan subalgebra, map to linear combinations of the $h_{k}^{\,\,\, d}$ matrices.) It can further be used to identify $\mathfrak{gl}(d,\Complex)$, as $d \to \infty$, with the algebra of Poisson brackets.

=== Properties ===
With respect to the Hilbert–Schmidt inner product on operators, $\langle A, B \rangle_\text{HS} = \operatorname{Tr}(A^* B)$, Sylvester's generalized Pauli operators are orthogonal and normalized to $\sqrt{d}$:

$$\langle \sigma_{k,j}, \sigma_{k',j'} \rangle_{\text{HS}} = \delta_{k k'}\delta_{j j'} \| \sigma_{k,j}\|^2_{\text{HS}} = d \delta_{k k'}\delta_{j j'}$$.

This can be checked directly from the above definition of $\sigma_{k,j}$.

== See also ==
- Heisenberg group § Heisenberg group modulo an odd prime p
- Hermitian matrix
- Bloch sphere
- Discrete Fourier transform
- Generalized Clifford algebra
- Weyl–Brauer matrices
- Circulant matrix
- Shift operator
- Quantum Fourier transform
- 3D rotation group § A note on Lie algebras
