= Paranormal (disambiguation) =

A paranormal event is one that allegedly defies scientific explanation.

Paranormal may also refer to:

== Arts and entertainment ==
- Paranormal fiction genre
- Paranormal (Prozak album), second studio album by US rapper Prozak; released in 2012
- Paranormal (Alice Cooper album), 27th studio album by rock musician Alice Cooper; released in 2017
- Paranormal (TV series), an Egyptian television series; released on Netflix in 2020
- Paranormal (BBC TV series) presented by Sian Eleri from 2023 to present

== Mathematics ==
- Paranorm, a metrizable topological vector space
- Paranormal operator, a generalization of a normal operator
- Paranormal space, a topological property
- Paranormal subgroup, a subgroup property

== See also ==
- ParaNorman, a 2012 film
- "Paranormalist", a storyline in the science fiction comedy webtoon series Live with Yourself!
