= Convexoid operator =

In mathematics, especially operator theory, a convexoid operator is a bounded linear operator T on a complex Hilbert space H such that the closure of the numerical range coincides with the convex hull of its spectrum.

An example of such an operator is a normal operator (or some of its generalization).

A closely related operator is a spectraloid operator: an operator whose spectral radius coincides with its numerical radius. In fact, an operator T is convexoid if and only if $T - \lambda$ is spectraloid for every complex number $\lambda$.

== See also ==
- Aluthge transform
