= Aluthge =

Aluthge may refer to:

- Aluthge transform, mathematics concept
- Asela Aluthge (born 1987), Sri Lankan cricketer
