= Right shift =

Right shift may refer to:

- Logical right shift, a computer operation
- Arithmetic right shift, a computer operation
- Shift operator § Sequences, a linear operator in functional analysis
  - Shift matrix, the finite-dimensional analogue
- Right Shift key, a key on a computer keyboard
- Rightshifting (cultural change), changing mindsets away from overly analytical to more synergistic (also known as the Marshall Model)

== See also ==
- Left shift (disambiguation)
