= Paranormal operator =

Operator type

In mathematics, especially operator theory, a paranormal operator is a generalization of a normal operator. More precisely, a bounded linear operator T on a complex Hilbert space H is said to be paranormal if:

$$\|T^2x\| \ge \|Tx\|^2$$

for every unit vector x in H.

The class of paranormal operators was introduced by V. Istratescu in 1960s, though the term "paranormal" is probably due to Furuta.

Every hyponormal operator (in particular, a subnormal operator, a quasinormal operator and a normal operator) is paranormal. If T is a paranormal, then T^{n} is paranormal. On the other hand, Halmos gave an example of a hyponormal operator T such that T^{2} isn't hyponormal. Consequently, not every paranormal operator is hyponormal.

A compact paranormal operator is normal.
