= Subnormal =

Subnormal may refer to:

- Subnormal body temperature, a common term for hypothermia
- Subnormal operator, a type of operator in operator theory in mathematics
- Subnormal number, another name for a denormal number in floating point arithmetic
- Subnormal profit, which is negative profit (economics)
- Subnormal series, a type of subgroup series in group theory in mathematics
- Subnormal subgroup, a type of subgroup in group theory in mathematics
- The projection of a normal of a curve onto the x-axis; see subtangent
