= Lomonosov's invariant subspace theorem =

Lomonosov's invariant subspace theorem is a mathematical theorem from functional analysis concerning the existence of invariant subspaces of a linear operator on some complex Banach space. The theorem was proved in 1973 by the Russian–American mathematician Victor Lomonosov.

== Lomonosov's invariant subspace theorem ==
=== Notation and terminology ===
Let $\mathcal{B}(X):=\mathcal{B}(X,X)$ be the space of bounded linear operators from some space $X$ to itself. For an operator $T\in\mathcal{B}(X)$ we call a closed subspace $M\subset X,\;M\neq \{0\}$ an invariant subspace if $T(M)\subset M$, i.e. $Tx\in M$ for every $x\in M$.

=== Theorem ===
Let $X$ be an infinite dimensional complex Banach space, $T\in\mathcal{B}(X)$ be compact and such that $T\neq 0$. Further let $S\in\mathcal{B}(X)$ be an operator that commutes with $T$. Then there exist an invariant subspace $M$ of the operator $S$, i.e. $S(M)\subset M$.
