= Victor Lomonosov =

Russian-American mathematician (1946–2018)

Victor Lomonosov (7 February 1946 – 29 March 2018) was a Russian-American mathematician known for his work in functional analysis. In operator theory, he is best known for his work in 1973 on the invariant subspace problem, which was described by Walter Rudin in his classical book on Functional Analysis as "Lomonosov's spectacular invariant subspace theorem". Lomonosov gives a very short proof, using the Schauder fixed point theorem, that if a bounded linear operator T on a Banach space commutes with a non-zero compact operator then T has a non-trivial invariant subspace. Lomonosov has also published on the Bishop–Phelps theorem and Burnside's Theorem.

Lomonosov received his master's degree from Moscow State University in 1969 and his Ph.D. from the National University of Kharkiv in 1974 (adviser Vladimir Matsaev). He was appointed as an Associate Professor at Kent State University in the fall of 1991 and was promoted to Professor at the same university in 1999.
