= H square =

In mathematics and control theory, H^{2}, or H-square is a Hardy space with square norm. It is a subspace of L^{2} space, and is thus a Hilbert space. In particular, it is a reproducing kernel Hilbert space.

== On the unit circle ==
In general, elements of L^{2} on the unit circle are given by

$$\sum_{n=-\infty}^\infty a_n e^{in\varphi}$$

whereas elements of H^{2} are given by

$$\sum_{n=0}^\infty a_n e^{in\varphi}.$$

The projection from L^{2} to H^{2} (by setting a_{n} = 0 when n < 0) is orthogonal.

== On the half-plane ==
The Laplace transform $\mathcal{L}$ given by

$$[\mathcal{L}f](s)=\int_0^\infty e^{-st}f(t)dt$$

can be understood as a linear operator

$$\mathcal{L}:L^2(0,\infty)\to
H^2\left(\mathbb{C}^+\right)$$

where $L^2(0,\infty)$ is the set of square-integrable functions on the positive real number line, and $\mathbb{C}^+$ is the right half of the complex plane. It is more; it is an isomorphism, in that it is invertible, and it isometric, in that it satisfies

$$\|\mathcal{L}f\|_{H^2} = \sqrt{2\pi} \|f\|_{L^2}.$$

The Laplace transform is "half" of a Fourier transform; from the decomposition

$$L^2(\mathbb{R})=L^2(-\infty,0) \oplus L^2(0,\infty)$$

one then obtains an orthogonal decomposition of $L^2(\mathbb{R})$ into two Hardy spaces

$$L^2(\mathbb{R})=
H^2\left(\mathbb{C}^-\right) \oplus
H^2\left(\mathbb{C}^+\right).$$

This is essentially the Paley-Wiener theorem.

== See also ==
- Hardy space
- H_{∞}
- Unilateral shift operator
