= Subnormal operator =

In mathematics, especially operator theory, subnormal operators are bounded operators on a Hilbert space defined by weakening the requirements for normal operators. Some examples of subnormal operators are isometries and Toeplitz operators with analytic symbols.

== Definition ==
Let H be a Hilbert space. A bounded operator A on H is said to be subnormal if A has a normal extension. In other words, A is subnormal if there exists a Hilbert space K such that H can be embedded in K and there exists a normal operator N of the form

$$N = \begin{bmatrix} A & B\\ 0 & C\end{bmatrix}$$

for some bounded operators

$$B : H^{\perp} \rightarrow H, \quad \mbox{and} \quad C : H^{\perp} \rightarrow H^{\perp}.$$

== Normality, quasinormality, and subnormality ==
=== Normal operators ===
Every normal operator is subnormal by definition, but the converse is not true in general. A simple class of examples can be obtained by weakening the properties of unitary operators. A unitary operator is an isometry with dense range. Consider now an isometry A whose range is not necessarily dense. A concrete example of such is the unilateral shift, which is not normal. But A is subnormal and this can be shown explicitly. Define an operator U on

$$H \oplus H$$

by

$$U = \begin{bmatrix} A & I - AA^* \\ 0 & - A^* \end{bmatrix}.$$

Direct calculation shows that U is unitary, therefore a normal extension of A. The operator U is called the unitary dilation of the isometry A.

=== Quasinormal operators ===
An operator A is said to be quasinormal if A commutes with A*A. A normal operator is thus quasinormal; the converse is not true. A counter example is given, as above, by the unilateral shift. Therefore, the family of normal operators is a proper subset of both quasinormal and subnormal operators. A natural question is how are the quasinormal and subnormal operators related.

We will show that a quasinormal operator is necessarily subnormal but not vice versa. Thus the normal operators is a proper subfamily of quasinormal operators, which in turn are contained by the subnormal operators. To argue the claim that a quasinormal operator is subnormal, recall the following property of quasinormal operators:

Fact: A bounded operator A is quasinormal if and only if in its polar decomposition A = UP, the partial isometry U and positive operator P commute.

Given a quasinormal A, the idea is to construct dilations for U and P in a sufficiently nice way so everything commutes. Suppose for the moment that U is an isometry. Let V be the unitary dilation of U,

$$V = \begin{bmatrix} U & I - UU^* \\ 0 & - U^* \end{bmatrix}
= \begin{bmatrix} U & D_{U^*} \\ 0 & - U^* \end{bmatrix}
.$$

Define

$$Q = \begin{bmatrix} P & 0 \\ 0 & P \end{bmatrix}.$$

The operator N = VQ is clearly an extension of A. We show it is a normal extension via direct calculation. Unitarity of V means

$$N^*N = QV^*VQ = Q^2 = \begin{bmatrix} P^2 & 0 \\ 0 & P^2 \end{bmatrix}.$$

On the other hand,

$$N N^* = \begin{bmatrix} UP^2U^* + D_{U^*} P^2 D_{U^*} & -D_{U^*}P^2 U \\ -U^* P^2 D_{U^*} & U^* P^2 U \end{bmatrix}.$$

Because UP = PU and P is self adjoint, we have U*P = PU* and D_{U*}P = D_{U*}P. Comparing entries then shows N is normal. This proves quasinormality implies subnormality.

For a counter example that shows the converse is not true, consider again the unilateral shift A. The operator B = A + s for some scalar s remains subnormal. But if B is quasinormal, a straightforward calculation shows that A*A = AA*, which is a contradiction.

== Minimal normal extension ==
=== Non-uniqueness of normal extensions ===
Given a subnormal operator A, its normal extension B is not unique. For example, let A be the unilateral shift, on l^{2}(N). One normal extension is the bilateral shift B on l^{2}(Z) defined by

$$B (\ldots, a_{-1}, {\hat a_0}, a_1, \ldots) = (\ldots, {\hat a_{-1}}, a_0, a_1, \ldots),$$

where ˆ denotes the zero-th position. B can be expressed in terms of the operator matrix

$$B = \begin{bmatrix} A & I - AA^* \\ 0 & A^* \end{bmatrix}.$$

Another normal extension is given by the unitary dilation B' of A defined above:

$$B' = \begin{bmatrix} A & I - AA^* \\ 0 & - A^* \end{bmatrix}$$

whose action is described by

$$B' (\ldots, a_{-2}, a_{-1}, {\hat a_0}, a_1, a_2, \ldots) = (\ldots, - a_{-2}, {\hat a_{-1}}, a_0, a_1, a_2, \ldots).$$

=== Minimality ===
Thus one is interested in the normal extension that is, in some sense, smallest. More precisely, a normal operator B acting on a Hilbert space K is said to be a minimal extension of a subnormal A if K' ⊂ K is a reducing subspace of B and H ⊂ K' , then K' = K. (A subspace is a reducing subspace of B if it is invariant under both B and B*.)

One can show that if two operators B_{1} and B_{2} are minimal extensions on K_{1} and K_{2}, respectively, then there exists a unitary operator

$$U: K_1 \rightarrow K_2.$$

Also, the following intertwining relationship holds:

$$U B_1 = B_2 U. \,$$

This can be shown constructively. Consider the set S consisting of vectors of the following form:

$$\sum_{i=0}^n (B_1^*)^i h_i = h_0+ B_1 ^* h_1 + (B_1^*)^2 h_2 + \cdots + (B_1^*)^n h_n \quad \text{where} \quad h_i \in H.$$

Let K' ⊂ K_{1} be the subspace that is the closure of the linear span of S. By definition, K' is invariant under B_{1}* and contains H. The normality of B_{1} and the assumption that H is invariant under B_{1} imply K' is invariant under B_{1}. Therefore, K' = K_{1}. The Hilbert space K_{2} can be identified in exactly the same way. Now we define the operator U as follows:

$$U \sum_{i=0}^n (B_1^*)^i h_i = \sum_{i=0}^n (B_2^*)^i h_i$$

Because

$$\left\langle \sum_{i=0}^n (B_1^*)^i h_i, \sum_{j=0}^n (B_1^*)^j h_j\right\rangle
= \sum_{i j} \langle  h_i, (B_1)^i (B_1^*)^j h_j\rangle
= \sum_{i j} \langle  (B_2)^j h_i,  (B_2)^i h_j\rangle
= \left\langle \sum_{i=0}^n (B_2^*)^i h_i, \sum_{j=0}^n (B_2^*)^j h_j\right\rangle ,$$

, the operator U is unitary. Direct computation also shows (the assumption that both B_{1} and B_{2} are extensions of A are needed here)

$$\text{if } g = \sum_{i=0}^n (B_1^*)^i h_i ,$$

$$\text{then } U B_1 g = B_2 U g = \sum_{i=0}^n (B_2^*)^i A h_i.$$

When B_{1} and B_{2} are not assumed to be minimal, the same calculation shows that above claim holds verbatim with U being a partial isometry.
