= Reducing subspace =

Concept in linear algebra

In linear algebra, a reducing subspace $W$ of a linear map $T:V\to V$ from a Hilbert space $V$ to itself is an invariant subspace of $T$ whose orthogonal complement $W^\perp$ is also an invariant subspace of $T.$ That is, $T(W) \subseteq W$ and $T(W^\perp) \subseteq W^\perp.$ One says that the subspace $W$ reduces the map $T.$

One says that a linear map is reducible if it has a nontrivial reducing subspace. Otherwise one says it is irreducible.

If $V$ is of finite dimension $r$ and $W$ is a reducing subspace of the map $T:V\to V$ represented under basis $B$ by matrix $M \in\R^{r\times r}$ then $M$ can be expressed as the sum

$$M = P_W M P_W + P_{W^\perp} M P_{W^\perp}$$

where $P_W \in\R^{r\times r}$ is the matrix of the orthogonal projection from $V$ to $W$ and $P_{W^\perp} = I - P_{W}$ is the matrix of the projection onto $W^\perp.$ (Here $I \in \R^{r\times r}$ is the identity matrix.)

Furthermore, $V$ has an orthonormal basis $B'$ with a subset that is an orthonormal basis of $W$. If $Q \in \R^{r\times r}$ is the transition matrix from $B$ to $B'$ then with respect to $B'$ the matrix $Q^{-1}MQ$ representing $T$ is a block-diagonal matrix

$$Q^{-1}MQ = \left[ \begin{array}{cc} A & 0 \\ 0 & B \end{array} \right]$$

with $A\in\R^{d\times d},$ where $d= \dim W$, and $B\in\R^{(r-d)\times(r-d)}.$
