= Generalized Clifford algebra =

In mathematics, a generalized Clifford algebra (GCA) is a unital associative algebra that generalizes the Clifford algebra, and goes back to the work of Hermann Weyl, who utilized and formalized these clock-and-shift operators introduced by J. J. Sylvester (1882), and organized by Cartan (1898) and Schwinger.

Clock and shift matrices find routine applications in numerous areas of mathematical physics, providing the cornerstone of quantum mechanical dynamics in finite-dimensional vector spaces. The concept of a spinor can further be linked to these algebras.

The term generalized Clifford algebra can also refer to associative algebras that are constructed using forms of higher degree instead of quadratic forms.

== Definition and properties ==
=== Abstract definition ===
The n-dimensional generalized Clifford algebra is defined as an associative algebra over a field F, generated by

$$\begin{align}
e_j e_k &= \omega_{jk} e_k e_j \\
\omega_{jk} e_\ell &= e_\ell \omega_{jk} \\
\omega_{jk} \omega_{\ell m} &= \omega_{\ell m} \omega_{jk}
\end{align}$$

and

$$e_j^{N_j} = 1 = \omega_{jk}^{N_j} = \omega_{jk}^{N_k} \,$$

∀ j,k,ℓ,m = 1, . . . ,n.

Moreover, in any irreducible matrix representation, relevant for physical applications, it is required that

$$\omega_{jk} = \omega_{kj}^{-1} = e^{2\pi i \nu_{kj}/N_{kj}}$$

∀ j,k = 1, . . . ,n, and $N_{kj} ={}$gcd$(N_j, N_k)$. The field F is usually taken to be the complex numbers C.

=== More specific definition ===
In the more common cases of GCA, the n-dimensional generalized Clifford algebra of order p has the property ω_{kj} = ω, $N_k=p$ for all j,k, and $\nu_{kj}=1$. It follows that

$$\begin{align}
e_j e_k &= \omega \, e_k e_j \,\\
\omega e_\ell &= e_\ell \omega \,
\end{align}$$

and

$$e_j^p = 1 = \omega^p \,$$

for all j,k,ℓ = 1, . . . ,n, and

$$\omega = e^{2\pi i /p}$$

is the pth root of 1.

There exist several definitions of a Generalized Clifford Algebra in the literature.

Clifford algebra

In the (orthogonal) Clifford algebra, the elements follow an anticommutation rule, with ω = −1, and p = 2.

== Matrix representation ==
The Clock and Shift matrices can be represented by n×n matrices in Schwinger's canonical notation as

$$\begin{align}
V &= \begin{pmatrix}
0 & 1 &      0 & \cdots & 0\\
0 & 0 &      1 & \cdots & 0\\
0 & 0 & \ddots &      1 & 0\\
\vdots & \vdots & \vdots & \ddots & \vdots\\
1 & 0 &      0 & \cdots & 0
\end{pmatrix}, &
U &= \begin{pmatrix}
1 &      0 &        0 & \cdots & 0\\
0 & \omega &        0 & \cdots & 0\\
0 &      0 & \omega^2 & \cdots & 0\\
\vdots & \vdots & \vdots & \ddots & \vdots\\
0 &      0 &        0 & \cdots & \omega^{(n-1)}
\end{pmatrix}, &
W &= \begin{pmatrix}
1 &            1 &               1 & \cdots & 1\\
1 &       \omega &        \omega^2 & \cdots & \omega^{n-1}\\
1 &     \omega^2 &    (\omega^2)^2 & \cdots & \omega^{2(n-1)}\\
\vdots &  \vdots &          \vdots & \ddots & \vdots\\
1 & \omega^{n-1} & \omega^{2(n-1)} & \cdots & \omega^{(n-1)^2}
\end{pmatrix}
\end{align}$$.

Notably, V^{n} = 1, VU = ωUV (the Weyl braiding relations), and W^{−1}VW = U (the discrete Fourier transform). With e_{1} = V , e_{2} = VU, and e_{3} = U, one has three basis elements which, together with ω, fulfil the above conditions of the Generalized Clifford Algebra (GCA).

These matrices, V and U, normally referred to as "shift and clock matrices", were introduced by J. J. Sylvester in the 1880s. (Note that the matrices V are cyclic permutation matrices that perform a circular shift; they are not to be confused with upper and lower shift matrices which have ones only either above or below the diagonal, respectively.)

=== Specific examples ===
==== Case n = p = 2 ====
In this case, we have ω = −1, and

$$\begin{align}
V &= \begin{pmatrix}
0 & 1\\
1 & 0
\end{pmatrix}, &
U &= \begin{pmatrix}
1 &  0 \\
0 & -1
\end{pmatrix}, &
W &= \begin{pmatrix}
1 &  1 \\
1 & -1
\end{pmatrix}
\end{align}$$

thus

$$\begin{align}
e_1 &= \begin{pmatrix}
0 & 1 \\
1 & 0
\end{pmatrix}, &
e_2 &= \begin{pmatrix}
0 & -1 \\
1 &  0
\end{pmatrix}, &
e_3 &= \begin{pmatrix}
1 &  0 \\
0 & -1
\end{pmatrix},
\end{align}$$

which constitute the Pauli matrices.

==== Case n = p = 4 ====
In this case we have ω = i, and

$$\begin{align}
V &= \begin{pmatrix}
0 & 1 & 0 & 0\\
0 & 0 & 1 & 0\\
0 & 0 & 0 & 1\\
1 & 0 & 0 & 0
\end{pmatrix}, &
U &= \begin{pmatrix}
1 & 0 &  0 &  0\\
0 & i &  0 &  0\\
0 & 0 & -1 &  0\\
0 & 0 &  0 & -i
\end{pmatrix}, &
W &= \begin{pmatrix}
1 &  1 &  1 &  1\\
1 &  i & -1 & -i\\
1 & -1 &  1 & -1\\
1 & -i & -1 &  i
\end{pmatrix}
\end{align}$$

and e_{1}, e_{2}, e_{3} may be determined accordingly.

== See also ==
- Generalizations of Pauli matrices
- DFT matrix
- Circulant matrix
