= Aluthge transform =

In mathematics and more precisely in functional analysis, the Aluthge transformation is an operation defined on the set of bounded operators of a Hilbert space. It was introduced by Ariyadasa Aluthge to study p-hyponormal linear operators.

== Definition ==
Let $H$ be a Hilbert space and let $B(H)$ be the algebra of linear operators from $H$ to $H$. By the polar decomposition theorem, there exists a unique partial isometry $U$ such that $T=U|T|$ and $\ker(U)\supset\ker(T)$, where $|T|$ is the square root of the operator $T^*T$. If $T\in B(H)$ and $T=U|T|$ is its polar decomposition, the Aluthge transform of $T$ is the operator $\Delta(T)$ defined as:
$$\Delta(T)=|T|^{\frac12}U|T|^{\frac12}.$$

More generally, for any real number $\lambda\in [0,1]$, the $\lambda$-Aluthge transformation is defined as
$$\Delta_\lambda(T):=|T|^{\lambda}U|T|^{1-\lambda}\in B(H).$$

== Example ==
For vectors $x,y \in H$, let $x\otimes y$ denote the operator defined as
$$\forall z\in H\quad x\otimes y(z)=\langle z,y\rangle x.$$

An elementary calculation shows that if $y\ne0$, then $\Delta_\lambda(x\otimes y)=\Delta(x\otimes y)=\frac{\langle x,y\rangle}{\lVert y \rVert^2} y\otimes y.$
