= Shift matrix =

Square matrix with ones on a superdiagonal or subdiagonal

In mathematics, a shift matrix is a binary matrix with ones only on the superdiagonal or subdiagonal, and zeroes elsewhere. A shift matrix U with ones on the superdiagonal is an upper shift matrix. The alternative subdiagonal matrix L is unsurprisingly known as a lower shift matrix. The (i, j)th component of U and L are

$$U_{ij} = \delta_{i+1,j}, \quad L_{ij} = \delta_{i,j+1},$$

where $\delta_{ij}$ is the Kronecker delta symbol.

For example, the 5 × 5 shift matrices are

$$U_5 = \begin{pmatrix}
0 & 1 & 0 & 0 & 0 \\
0 & 0 & 1 & 0 & 0 \\
0 & 0 & 0 & 1 & 0 \\
0 & 0 & 0 & 0 & 1 \\
0 & 0 & 0 & 0 & 0
\end{pmatrix} \quad
L_5 = \begin{pmatrix}
0 & 0 & 0 & 0 & 0 \\
1 & 0 & 0 & 0 & 0 \\
0 & 1 & 0 & 0 & 0 \\
0 & 0 & 1 & 0 & 0 \\
0 & 0 & 0 & 1 & 0
\end{pmatrix}.$$

Clearly, the transpose of a lower shift matrix is an upper shift matrix and vice versa.

As a linear transformation, a lower shift matrix shifts the components of a column vector one position down, with a zero appearing in the first position. An upper shift matrix shifts the components of a column vector one position up, with a zero appearing in the last position.

Premultiplying a matrix A by a lower shift matrix results in the elements of A being shifted downward by one position, with zeroes appearing in the top row. Postmultiplication by a lower shift matrix results in a shift left. Similar operations involving an upper shift matrix result in the opposite shift.

Clearly all finite-dimensional shift matrices are nilpotent; an n × n shift matrix S becomes the zero matrix when raised to the power of its dimension n.

Shift matrices act on shift spaces. The infinite-dimensional shift matrices are particularly important for the study of ergodic systems. Important examples of infinite-dimensional shifts are the Bernoulli shift, which acts as a shift on Cantor space, and the Gauss map, which acts as a shift on the space of continued fractions (that is, on Baire space).

== Properties ==
Let L and U be the n × n lower and upper shift matrices, respectively. The following properties hold for both U and L. Let us therefore only list the properties for U:

- det(U) = 0
- tr(U) = 0
- rank(U) = n − 1
- The characteristic polynomials of U is
  $$p_U(\lambda) = (-1)^n\lambda^n.$$
- U^{n} = 0. This follows from the previous property by the Cayley–Hamilton theorem.
- The permanent of U is 0.

The following properties show how U and L are related:

- L^{T} = U; U^{T} = L
- The null spaces of U and L are
  $$N(U) = \operatorname{span}\left\{ (1, 0, \ldots, 0)^\mathsf{T} \right\},$$
  $$N(L) = \operatorname{span}\left\{ (0, \ldots, 0, 1)^\mathsf{T} \right\}.$$
- The spectrum of U and L is $\{0\}$. The algebraic multiplicity of 0 is n, and its geometric multiplicity is 1. From the expressions for the null spaces, it follows that (up to a scaling) the only eigenvector for U is $(1, 0, \ldots, 0)^\mathsf{T}$, and the only eigenvector for L is $(0, \ldots, 0, 1)^\mathsf{T}$.
- For LU and UL we have
  $$UL = I - \operatorname{diag}(0, \ldots, 0, 1),$$
  $$LU = I - \operatorname{diag}(1, 0, \ldots, 0).$$
  These matrices are both idempotent, symmetric, and have the same rank as U and L
- L^{n−a}U^{n−a} + L^{a}U^{a} = U^{n−a}L^{n−a} + U^{a}L^{a} = I (the identity matrix), for any integer a between 0 and n inclusive.

If N is any nilpotent matrix, then N is similar to a block diagonal matrix of the form

$$\begin{pmatrix}
S_1 & 0 & \ldots & 0 \\
0 & S_2 & \ldots & 0 \\
\vdots & \vdots & \ddots & \vdots \\
0 & 0 & \ldots & S_r
\end{pmatrix}$$

where each of the blocks S_{1}, S_{2}, ..., S_{r} is a shift matrix (possibly of different sizes).

== Examples ==
$$S = \begin{pmatrix}
0 & 0 & 0 & 0 & 0 \\
1 & 0 & 0 & 0 & 0 \\
0 & 1 & 0 & 0 & 0 \\
0 & 0 & 1 & 0 & 0 \\
0 & 0 & 0 & 1 & 0
\end{pmatrix}; \quad A = \begin{pmatrix}
1 & 1 & 1 & 1 & 1 \\
1 & 2 & 2 & 2 & 1 \\
1 & 2 & 3 & 2 & 1 \\
1 & 2 & 2 & 2 & 1 \\
1 & 1 & 1 & 1 & 1
\end{pmatrix}.$$

Then,

$$SA = \begin{pmatrix}
0 & 0 & 0 & 0 & 0 \\
1 & 1 & 1 & 1 & 1 \\
1 & 2 & 2 & 2 & 1 \\
1 & 2 & 3 & 2 & 1 \\
1 & 2 & 2 & 2 & 1
\end{pmatrix}; \quad AS = \begin{pmatrix}
1 & 1 & 1 & 1 & 0 \\
2 & 2 & 2 & 1 & 0 \\
2 & 3 & 2 & 1 & 0 \\
2 & 2 & 2 & 1 & 0 \\
1 & 1 & 1 & 1 & 0
\end{pmatrix}.$$

Clearly there are many possible permutations. For example, $S^\mathsf{T} A S$ is equal to the matrix A shifted up and left along the main diagonal.

$$S^\mathsf{T}AS=\begin{pmatrix}
2 & 2 & 2 & 1 & 0 \\
2 & 3 & 2 & 1 & 0 \\
2 & 2 & 2 & 1 & 0 \\
1 & 1 & 1 & 1 & 0 \\
0 & 0 & 0 & 0 & 0
\end{pmatrix}.$$

== See also ==
- Clock and shift matrices
- Nilpotent matrix
- Subshift of finite type
- Unilateral shift operator
