= Shift operator =

Linear mathematical operator which translates a function

In mathematics, and in particular functional analysis, the shift operator, also known as the translation operator, is an operator that takes a function x ↦ f(x) to its translation x ↦ f(x + a). In time series analysis, the shift operator is called the lag operator.

Shift operators are examples of linear operators, important for their simplicity and natural occurrence. The shift operator action on functions of a real variable plays an important role in harmonic analysis, for example, it appears in the definitions of almost periodic functions, positive-definite functions, derivatives, and convolution. Shifts of sequences (functions of an integer variable) appear in diverse areas such as Hardy spaces, the theory of abelian varieties, and the theory of symbolic dynamics, for which the baker's map is an explicit representation. The notion of triangulated category is a categorified analogue of the shift operator.

== Definition ==
=== Functions of a real variable ===
The shift operator T^{t} (where $t \in \R$) takes a function f on $\R$ to its translation f_{t},

$$T^t f(x) =  f_t(x) = f(x+t)~.$$

A practical operational calculus representation of the linear operator T^{t} in terms of the plain derivative $\tfrac{d}{dx}$ was introduced by Lagrange,

$T^t= e^{t \frac d {dx}}~,$

which may be interpreted operationally through its formal Taylor expansion in t; and whose action on the monomial x^{n} is evident by the binomial theorem, and hence on all series in x, and so all functions f(x) as above. This, then, is a formal encoding of the Taylor expansion in Heaviside's calculus.

The operator thus provides the prototype for Lie's celebrated advective flow for Abelian groups,

$$\exp\left(t \beta(x) \frac{d}{dx}\right) f(x) = \exp\left(t \frac{d}{dh}\right) F(h) = F(h+t) = f\left(h^{-1}(h(x)+t)\right),$$

where the canonical coordinates h (Abel functions) are defined such that

$$h'(x)\equiv \frac 1 {\beta(x)} ~, \qquad f(x)\equiv F(h(x)).$$

For example, it easily follows that $\beta (x)=x$ yields scaling,

$$\exp\left(t x \frac{d}{dx}\right) f(x) =   f(e^t x) ,$$

hence $\exp\left(i\pi x \tfrac{d}{dx}\right) f(x) = f(-x)$ (parity); likewise, $\beta (x)=x^2$ yields

$$\exp\left(t x^2 \frac{d}{dx}\right) f(x) = f \left(\frac{x}{1-tx}\right),$$

$\beta (x)= \tfrac{1}{x}$ yields

$$\exp\left(\frac{t} {x} \frac{d}{dx}\right) f(x) = f \left(\sqrt{x^2+2t} \right) ,$$

$\beta (x)=e^x$ yields

$$\exp\left (t e^x \frac d {dx} \right ) f(x) = f\left (\ln \left (\frac{1}{e^{-x} - t} \right ) \right )  ,$$

etc.

The initial condition of the flow and the group property completely determine the entire Lie flow, providing a solution to the translation functional equation

$$f_t(f_\tau (x))=f_{t+\tau} (x)  .$$

=== Sequences ===
The left shift operator acts on one-sided infinite sequence of numbers by

$$S^*: (a_1, a_2, a_3, \ldots) \mapsto (a_2, a_3, a_4, \ldots)$$

and on two-sided infinite sequences by

$$T: (a_k)_{k\,=\,-\infty}^\infty \mapsto (a_{k+1})_{k\,=\,-\infty}^\infty.$$

The right shift operator acts on one-sided infinite sequence of numbers by

$$S: (a_1, a_2, a_3, \ldots) \mapsto (0, a_1, a_2, \ldots)$$

and on two-sided infinite sequences by

$$T^{-1}:(a_k)_{k\,=\,-\infty}^\infty \mapsto (a_{k-1})_{k\,=\,-\infty}^\infty.$$

The right and left shift operators acting on two-sided infinite sequences are called bilateral shifts. A finite-dimensional analog is given by the shift matrices.

=== Abelian groups ===
In general, as illustrated above, if F is a function on an abelian group G, and h is an element of G, the shift operator T^{g} maps F to

$$F_g(h) = F(h+g).$$

== Properties of the shift operator ==
The shift operator acting on real- or complex-valued functions or sequences is a linear operator which preserves most of the standard norms which appear in functional analysis. Therefore, it is usually a continuous operator with norm one.

=== Derivation via Taylor series ===
The operator may be derived by a simple distribution of linear operators. Given an analytic, smooth function $f$ evaluated at some $x$, its translation by some distance $t$ may be written

$f(x+t) = f(x) + tf'(x) + \frac{t^2}{2!}f''(x) + \frac{t^3}{3!}f'''(x) + \ldots$

Interpreting a power of the differential operator as a composition and thus its order, one can distribute terms, rewriting this expression as

$f(x+t) = \left(\sum_{k=0}^\infty \frac{\left(t\frac{d}{dx}\right)^k}{k!}\right)f(x) = e^{t\frac{d}{dx}}f(x)$

by the definition of the power series representation of the exponential function.

=== Action on Hilbert spaces ===
The shift operator acting on two-sided sequences is a unitary operator on $\ell_2(\Z).$ The shift operator acting on functions of a real variable is a unitary operator on $L_2(\R).$

In both cases, the (left) shift operator satisfies the following commutation relation with the Fourier transform:
$$\mathcal{F} T^t = M^t \mathcal{F},$$
where M^{t} is the multiplication operator by exp(itx). Therefore, the spectrum of T^{t} is the unit circle.

The one-sided shift S acting on $\ell_2(\N)$ is a proper isometry with range equal to all vectors which vanish in the first coordinate. The operator S is a compression of T^{−1}, in the sense that
$$T^{-1}y = Sx \text{ for each } x \in \ell^2(\N),$$
where y is the vector in $\ell_2(\Z)$ with y_{i} = x_{i} for i ≥ 0 and y_{i} = 0 for i < 0. This observation is at the heart of the construction of many unitary dilations of isometries.

The spectrum of S is the unit disk. The shift S is one example of a Fredholm operator; it has Fredholm index −1.

== Generalization ==
Jean Delsarte introduced the notion of generalized shift operator (also called generalized displacement operator); it was further developed by Boris Levitan.

A family of operators $\{L^x\}_{x \in X}$ acting on a space Φ of functions from a set X to $\C$ is called a family of generalized shift operators if the following properties hold:

1. Associativity: let $(R^y f)(x) = (L^x f)(y).$ Then $L^x R^y = R^y L^x.$
2. There exists e in X such that L^{e} is the identity operator.

In this case, the set X is called a hypergroup.

== See also ==
- Arithmetic shift
- Logical shift
- Clock and shift matrices
- Finite difference
- Translation operator (quantum mechanics)

== Bibliography ==
- Partington, Jonathan R. (March 15, 2004). Linear Operators and Linear Systems. Cambridge University Press. doi:10.1017/cbo9780511616693. ISBN 978-0-521-83734-7.
- Marvin Rosenblum and James Rovnyak, Hardy Classes and Operator Theory, (1985) Oxford University Press.
