= Hardy space =

Concept within complex analysis

In complex analysis, the Hardy spaces (or Hardy classes) $H^p$ are spaces of holomorphic functions on the unit disk or upper half plane. They were introduced by Frigyes Riesz (Riesz 1923), who named them after G. H. Hardy, because of the paper (Hardy 1915). In real analysis Hardy spaces are spaces of distributions on the real n-space $\mathbb{R}^n$, defined (in the sense of distributions) as boundary values of the holomorphic functions. Hardy spaces are related to the L^{p} spaces. For $1 \leq p < \infty$ these Hardy spaces are subsets of $L^p$ spaces, while for $0<p<1$ the $L^p$ spaces have some undesirable properties, and the Hardy spaces are much better behaved. Hence, $H^p$ spaces can be considered extensions of $L^p$ spaces.

Hardy spaces have a number of applications, both in mathematical analysis itself as well as in interdisciplinary areas such as control theory (e.g. $H^{\infty}$ methods) and scattering theory.

== Definition ==
=== On the unit disk ===
The Hardy space $H^p$ for $0 < p < \infty$ is the class of holomorphic functions $f$ on the open unit disk $\mathbb{D} = \{ z\in \mathbb{C} : |z|<1\}$ satisfying
$$\sup_{0\,\leqslant\, r\,<\,1}\left(\frac{1}{2\pi} \int_0^{2\pi}\left|f \left (re^{i\theta}\right )\right|^p \; \mathrm{d}\theta\right)^\frac{1}{p}<\infty.$$
If $p \geq 1$, this coincides with the definition of the Hardy space $p$-norm, denoted by $\|f\|_{H^p}.$

The space $H^\infty$ is defined as the vector space of bounded holomorphic functions on the unit disk, with norm

$${\|f\|}_{H^\infty} = \sup_{|z|< 1} \left|f(z)\right|.$$

For $0<p\leq q\leq\infty$, the class $H^q$ is a subset of $H^p$, and the $H^p$-norm is increasing with $p$ (it is a consequence of Hölder's inequality that the $L^p$-norm is increasing for probability measures, i.e. measures with total mass 1) (Rudin 1987, Def 17.7).

$H^2$ is a Hilbert space, and it is unitarily equivalent to $\ell^2(\N)$ via the unitary map $\sum_{n=0}^\infty a_n z^n \leftrightarrow (a_n)_{n=0}^\infty$.

=== On the unit circle ===
The Hardy spaces can also be viewed as closed vector subspaces of the complex L^{p} spaces on the unit circle $\mathbb T = \{ z \in \C : |z| = 1 \}$. This connection is provided by the following theorem (Katznelson 1976, Thm 3.8): Given $f \in H^{p}$ with $p\geq 1$, the radial limit
$$\tilde f\!\left(e^{i\theta}\right) = \lim_{r\to 1} \,f\!\left(re^{i\theta}\right)$$
exists for almost every $\theta$ and $\tilde f \in L^{p}(\mathbb{T})$ such that
$${\|\tilde f\|}_{L^p} = {\|f\|}_{H^p}.$$
Denote by $H^{p}(\mathbb{T})$ the vector subspace of $L^{p}(\mathbb{T})$ consisting of all limit functions $\tilde f$, when $f$ varies in $H^{p}$, one then has that for p ≥ 1,(Katznelson 1976)

$$g\in H^p\left(\mathbb{T}\right)\text{ if and only if } g\in L^p\left(\mathbb{T}\right)\text{ and } \hat{g}_{n} =0 \text{ for all } n < 0,$$

where the $\hat{g}_{n}$ are the Fourier coefficients defined as
$$\hat{g}_{n} = \frac{1}{2\pi}\int_0^{2\pi} g\left(e^{i\phi}\right) e^{-in\phi} \, \mathrm{d}\phi, \quad \forall n \in \mathbb{Z}.$$
The space $H^{p}(\mathbb{T})$ is a closed subspace of $L^{p}(\mathbb{T})$. Since $L^{p}(\mathbb{T})$ is a Banach space (for $1\leq p\leq \infty$), so is $H^{p}(\mathbb{T})$.

The above can be turned around. Given a function $\tilde f \in L^p (\mathbf T)$, with p ≥ 1, one can regain a (harmonic) function f on the unit disk by means of the Poisson kernel P_{r}:

$$f\left(re^{i\theta}\right)=\frac{1}{2\pi} \int_0^{2\pi} P_r(\theta-\phi) \tilde f\left(e^{i\phi}\right) \,\mathrm{d}\phi, \quad r < 1,$$

and f belongs to H^{p} exactly when $\tilde f$ is in H^{p}(T). Supposing that $\tilde f$ is in H^{p}(T), i.e., $\tilde f$ has Fourier coefficients (a_{n})_{n∈Z} with a_{n} = 0 for every n < 0, then the associated holomorphic function f of H^{p} is given by
$$f(z)=\sum_{n=0}^\infty a_n z^n, \ \ \ |z| < 1.$$
In applications, those functions with vanishing negative Fourier coefficients are commonly interpreted as the causal solutions. For example, the Hardy space H^{2} consists of functions whose mean square value remains bounded as $r \to 1$ from below. Thus, the space H^{2} is seen to sit naturally inside L^{2} space, and is represented by infinite sequences indexed by N; whereas L^{2} consists of bi-infinite sequences indexed by Z.

=== On the upper half plane ===
The Hardy space on the upper half-plane $\mathbb{H} = \{x + iy \mid y > 0;\ x, y \in \mathbb{R} \}$ is defined to be the space of holomorphic functions $f$ on $\mathbb{H}$ with bounded norm, given by
$$\|f\|_{H^p} = \sup_{y>0} \left ( \int_{-\infty}^{+\infty}|f(x+ iy)|^p\, \mathrm{d}x \right)^{\frac{1}{p}}.$$
The corresponding $H^{\infty}(\mathbb{H})$ is defined as functions of bounded norm, with the norm given by
$$\|f\|_{H^\infty} = \sup_{z\in\mathbb{H}}|f(z)|.$$
The unit disk is isomorphic to the upper half-plane by means of a Möbius transformation. For example, let $m: \mathbb{D}\rightarrow \mathbb{H}$ denote the Möbius transformation
$$m(z)= i \frac{1+z}{1-z}.$$
Then the linear operator $M:H^2(\mathbb{H}) \rightarrow H^2(\mathbb{D})$ defined by
$$(Mf)(z):=\frac{\sqrt{\pi}}{1-z} f(m(z)),$$
is an isometric isomorphism of Hardy spaces.

A similar approach applies to, e.g., the right half-plane.

=== On the real vector space ===
In analysis on the real vector space $\mathbb{R}^n$, the Hardy space $H^p$ (for $0 < p \leq \infty$) consists of tempered distributions $f$ such that for some Schwartz function $\Phi$ with $\int\Phi = 1$, the maximal function

$$(M_\Phi f)(x)=\sup_{t>0}|(f*\Phi_t)(x)|$$

is in $L^p(\mathbb{R}^n)$, where $*$ is convolution and $\Phi_t(x) = t^{-n}\Phi(x/t)$. The $H^p$-quasinorm $\|f\|_{H^p}$ of a distribution $f$ of $H^p$ is defined to be the $L^p$ norm of $M_\Phi f$ (this depends on the choice of $\Phi$, but different choices of Schwartz functions $\Phi$ give equivalent norms). The $H^p$-quasinorm is a norm when $p \geq 1$, but not when $p < 1$.

If $1 < p < \infty$, the Hardy space $H^p$ is the same vector space as $L^p$, with equivalent norm. When $p=1$, the Hardy space $H^1$ is a proper subspace of $L^1$. One can find sequences in $H^1$ that are bounded in $L^1$ but unbounded in $H^1$; for example, on the line

$$f_k(x) = \mathbf{1}_{[0, 1]}(x - k) -  \mathbf{1}_{[0, 1]}(x + k), \ \ \ k > 0.$$

The $L^1$ and $H^1$ norms are not equivalent on $H^1$, and $H^1$ is not closed in $L^1$. The dual of $H^1$ is the space $\operatorname{BMO}$ of functions of bounded mean oscillation. The space $\operatorname{BMO}$ contains unbounded functions (proving again that $H^1$ is not closed in $L^1$).

If $p<1$ then the Hardy space $H^p$ has elements that are not functions, and its dual is the homogeneous Lipschitz space of order $n(1/p-1)$. When '$p < 1$, the $H^p$-quasinorm is not a norm, as it is not subadditive. The $p$-th power $\|f\|^p_{H^p}$ is subadditive for $p<1$ and so defines a metric on the Hardy space $H^p$, which defines the topology and makes $H^p$ into a complete metric space.

==== Atomic decomposition ====
When $0 < p \leq 1$, a bounded measurable function $f$ of compact support is in the Hardy space $H^p$ if and only if all its moments

$$\int_{\mathbf{R}^n} f(x)x_1^{i_1}\ldots x_n^{i_n}\, \mathrm{d}x,$$

whose order $i_1+\cdots+i_n$ is at most $n(1/p-1)$, vanish. For example, the integral of $f$ must vanish in order that $f \in H^p$, $0 < p \leq 1$, and as long as $p > n/(n+1)$, this is also sufficient.

If in addition $f$ has support in some ball $B$ and is bounded by $|B|^{-1/p}$, then $f$ is called an $H^p$-atom (here $|B|$ denotes the Euclidean volume of $B$ in $\mathbb{R}^n$). The $H^p$-quasinorm of an arbitrary $H^p$-atom is bounded by a constant depending only on $p$ and on the Schwartz function $\Phi$.

When $0 < p \leq 1$, any element $f$ of $H^p$ has an atomic decomposition as a convergent infinite combination of $H^p$-atoms,

$$f = \sum c_j a_j, \ \ \ \sum |c_j|^p < \infty$$

where the $a_j$ are $H^p$-atoms and the $c_j$ are scalars.

On the line, for example, the difference of Dirac distributions $f = \delta_1 - \delta_0$ can be represented as a series of Haar functions, convergent in $H^p$-quasinorm when $1/2 < p < 1$. (On the circle, the corresponding representation is valid for $0 < p < 1$, but on the line, Haar functions do not belong to $H^p$ when $p \leq 1/2$, because their maximal function is equivalent at infinity to $ax^{-2}$ for some $a \neq 0$.)

== Link between real- and complex-variable Hardy spaces ==
Real-variable techniques, mainly associated to the study of real Hardy spaces defined on R^{n}, are also used in the simpler framework of the circle. It is a common practice to allow for complex functions (or distributions) in these "real" spaces. The definition that follows does not distinguish between real or complex case.

Let P_{r} denote the Poisson kernel on the unit circle T. For a distribution f on the unit circle, set

$$(M f)(e^{i\theta})=\sup_{0<r<1} \left |(f * P_r) \left(e^{i\theta} \right)\right|,$$

where the star indicates convolution between the distribution f and the function e^{iθ} → P_{r}(θ) on the circle. Namely, (f ∗ P_{r})(e^{iθ}) is the result of the action of f on the C^{∞}-function defined on the unit circle by

$$e^{i\varphi} \rightarrow P_r(\theta - \varphi).$$

For 0 < p < ∞, the real Hardy space H^{p}(T) consists of distributions f such that M f is in L^{p}(T).

The function F defined on the unit disk by F(re^{iθ}) = (f ∗ P_{r})(e^{iθ}) is harmonic, and M f is the radial maximal function of F. When M f belongs to L^{p}(T) and p ≥ 1, the distribution f "is" a function in L^{p}(T), namely the boundary value of F. For p ≥ 1, the real Hardy space H^{p}(T) is a subset of L^{p}(T).

=== Conjugate function ===
To every real trigonometric polynomial u on the unit circle, one associates the real conjugate polynomial v such that u + iv extends to a holomorphic function in the unit disk,

$$u(e^{i\theta}) = \frac{a_0}{2} + \sum_{k \geqslant 1} a_k \cos(k \theta) + b_k \sin(k \theta) \longrightarrow v(e^{i\theta}) = \sum_{k \geqslant 1} a_k \sin(k \theta) - b_k \cos(k \theta).$$

This mapping u → v extends to a bounded linear operator H on L^{p}(T), when 1 < p < ∞ (up to a scalar multiple, it is the Hilbert transform on the unit circle), and H also maps L^{1}(T) to weak-L^{1}(T). When 1 ≤ p < ∞, the following are equivalent for a real valued integrable function f on the unit circle:

- the function f is the real part of some function g ∈ H^{p}(T)
- the function f and its conjugate H(f) belong to L^{p}(T)
- the radial maximal function M f belongs to L^{p}(T).

When 1 < p < ∞, H(f) belongs to L^{p}(T) when f ∈ L^{p}(T), hence the real Hardy space H^{p}(T) coincides with L^{p}(T) in this case. For p = 1, the real Hardy space H^{1}(T) is a proper subspace of L^{1}(T).

The case of p = ∞ was excluded from the definition of real Hardy spaces, because the maximal function M f of an L^{∞} function is always bounded, and because it is not desirable that real-H^{∞} be equal to L^{∞}. However, the two following properties are equivalent for a real valued function f

- the function f is the real part of some function g ∈ H^{∞}(T)
- the function f and its conjugate H(f) belong to L^{∞}(T).

=== For 0 < p < 1 ===
When 0 < p < 1, a function F in H^{p} cannot be reconstructed from the real part of its boundary limit function on the circle, because of the lack of convexity of L^{p} in this case. Convexity fails but a kind of "complex convexity" remains, namely the fact that z → |z|^{q} is subharmonic for every q > 0. As a consequence, if

$$F(z) = \sum_{n=0}^{+\infty} c_n z^n, \quad |z| < 1$$

is in H^{p}, it can be shown that c_{n} = O(n^{1/p–1}). It follows that the Fourier series

$$\sum_{n=0}^{+\infty} c_n e^{in \theta}$$

converges in the sense of distributions to a distribution f on the unit circle, and F(re^{iθ}) =(f ∗ P_{r})(θ). The function F ∈ H^{p} can be reconstructed from the real distribution Re(f) on the circle, because the Taylor coefficients c_{n} of F can be computed from the Fourier coefficients of Re(f).

Distributions on the circle are general enough for handling Hardy spaces when p < 1. Distributions that are not functions do occur, as is seen with functions F(z) = (1−z)^{−N} (for |z| < 1), that belong to H^{p} when 0 < N p < 1 (and N an integer ≥ 1).

A real distribution on the circle belongs to real-H^{p}(T) iff it is the boundary value of the real part of some F ∈ H^{p}. A Dirac distribution δ_{x}, at any point x of the unit circle, belongs to real-H^{p}(T) for every p < 1; derivatives δ′_{x} belong when p < 1/2, second derivatives δ′′_{x} when p < 1/3, and so on.

== Beurling factorization ==
For 0 < p ≤ ∞, every non-zero function f in H^{p} can be written as the product f = Gh where G is an outer function and h is an inner function, as defined below (Rudin 1987, Thm 17.17). This "Beurling factorization" allows the Hardy space to be completely characterized by the spaces of inner and outer functions.

One says that G(z) is an outer (exterior) function if it takes the form

$$G(z) = c\, \exp\left(\frac{1}{2\pi}\int_{-\pi}^{\pi}\frac{e^{i\theta}+z}{e^{i\theta}-z} \log\!\left(\varphi\!\left(e^{i\theta} \right)\right)\, \mathrm{d}\theta \right)$$

for some complex number c with |c| = 1, and some positive measurable function $\varphi$ on the unit circle such that $\log(\varphi)$ is integrable on the circle. In particular, when $\varphi$ is integrable on the circle, G is in H^{1} because the above takes the form of the Poisson kernel (Rudin 1987, Thm 17.16). This implies that

$$\lim_{r\to 1^-}\left|G\left (re^{i\theta} \right)\right| = \varphi \left(e^{i\theta}\right )$$

for almost every θ.

One says that h is an inner (interior) function if and only if |h| ≤ 1 on the unit disk and the limit

$$\lim_{r\to 1^-} h(re^{i\theta})$$

exists for almost all θ and its modulus is equal to 1 a.e. In particular, h is in H^{∞}. The inner function can be further factored into a form involving a Blaschke product.

The function f, decomposed as f = Gh, is in H^{p} if and only if φ belongs to L^{p}(T), where φ is the positive function in the representation of the outer function G.

Let G be an outer function represented as above from a function φ on the circle. Replacing φ by φ^{α}, α > 0, a family (G_{α}) of outer functions is obtained, with the properties:

G_{1} = G, G_{α+β} = G_{α} G_{β} and |G_{α}| = |G|^{α} almost everywhere on the circle.

It follows that whenever 0 < p, q, r < ∞ and 1/r = 1/p + 1/q, every function f in H^{r} can be expressed as the product of a function in H^{p} and a function in H^{q}. For example: every function in H^{1} is the product of two functions in H^{2}; every function in H^{p}, p < 1, can be expressed as product of several functions in some H^{q}, q > 1.

== Martingale H^{p} ==
Let (M_{n})_{n≥0} be a martingale on some probability space (Ω, Σ, P), with respect to an increasing sequence of σ-fields (Σ_{n})_{n≥0}. Assume for simplicity that Σ is equal to the σ-field generated by the sequence (Σ_{n})_{n≥0}. The maximal function of the martingale is defined by

$$M^* = \sup_{n \ge 0} \, |M_n|.$$

Let 1 ≤ p < ∞. The martingale (M_{n})_{n≥0} belongs to martingale-H^{p} when M* ∈ L^{p}.

If M* ∈ L^{p}, the martingale (M_{n})_{n≥0} is bounded in L^{p}; hence it converges almost surely to some function f by the martingale convergence theorem. Moreover, M_{n} converges to f in L^{p}-norm by the dominated convergence theorem; hence M_{n} can be expressed as conditional expectation of f on Σ_{n}. It is thus possible to identify martingale-H^{p} with the subspace of L^{p}(Ω, Σ, P) consisting of those f such that the martingale

$$M_n = \operatorname E \bigl( f | \Sigma_n \bigr)$$

belongs to martingale-H^{p}.

Doob's maximal inequality implies that martingale-H^{p} coincides with L^{p}(Ω, Σ, P) when 1 < p < ∞. The interesting space is martingale-H^{1}, whose dual is martingale-BMO (Garsia 1973).

The Burkholder–Gundy inequalities (when p > 1) and the Burgess Davis inequality (when p = 1) relate the L^{p}-norm of the maximal function to that of the square function of the martingale

$$S(f) = \left( |M_0|^2 + \sum_{n=0}^{\infty} |M_{n+1} - M_n|^2 \right)^{\frac{1}{2}}.$$

Martingale-H^{p} can be defined by saying that S(f)∈ L^{p} (Garsia 1973).

Martingales with continuous time parameter can also be considered. A direct link with the classical theory is obtained via the complex Brownian motion (B_{t}) in the complex plane, starting from the point z = 0 at time t = 0. Let τ denote the hitting time of the unit circle. For every holomorphic function F in the unit disk,

$$M_t = F(B_{t \wedge \tau})$$

is a martingale, that belongs to martingale-H^{p} iff F ∈ H^{p} (Burkholder, Gundy & Silverstein 1971).

=== Example ===
In this example, Ω = [0, 1] and Σ_{n} is the finite field generated by the dyadic partition of [0, 1] into 2^{n} intervals of length 2^{−n}, for every n ≥ 0. If a function f on [0, 1] is represented by its expansion on the Haar system (h_{k})

$$f = \sum c_k h_k,$$

then the martingale-H^{1} norm of f can be defined by the L^{1} norm of the square function

$$\int_0^1 \Bigl( \sum |c_k h_k(x)|^2 \Bigr)^{\frac{1}{2}} \, \mathrm{d}x.$$

This space, sometimes denoted by H^{1}(δ), is isomorphic to the classical real H^{1} space on the circle (Müller 2005). The Haar system is an unconditional basis for H^{1}(δ).

== See also ==
- H^{2}
- H^{∞} methods
- Paley–Wiener theorem
