= Invariant subspace =

Subspace preserved by a linear mapping

In mathematics, an invariant subspace of a linear mapping T : V → V i.e. from some vector space V to itself, is a subspace W of V that is preserved by T. More generally, an invariant subspace for a collection of linear mappings is a subspace preserved by each mapping individually.

== For a single operator ==
Consider a vector space $V$ and a linear map $T: V \to V.$ A subspace $W \subseteq V$ is called an invariant subspace for $T$, or equivalently, T-invariant, if T transforms any vector $\mathbf{v} \in W$ back into W. In formulas, this can be written
$$\mathbf{v} \in W \implies T(\mathbf{v}) \in W$$
or
$$TW\subseteq W\text{.}$$

In this case, T restricts to an endomorphism of W:
$$T|_W : W \to W\text{;}\quad T|_W(\mathbf{w}) = T(\mathbf{w})\text{.}$$

The existence of an invariant subspace also has a matrix formulation. Pick a basis C for W and complete it to a basis B of V. With respect to B, the operator T has form
$$T = \begin{bmatrix} T|_W & T_{12} \\ 0 & T_{22} \end{bmatrix}$$
for some T_{12} and T_{22}, where $T|_W$ here denotes the matrix of $T|_W$ with respect to the basis C.

== Examples ==
Any linear map $T : V \to V$ admits the following invariant subspaces:

- The vector space $V$, because $T$ maps every vector in $V$ into $V.$
- The set $\{0\}$, because $T(0) = 0$.

These are the improper and trivial invariant subspaces, respectively. Certain linear operators have no proper non-trivial invariant subspace: for instance, rotation of a two-dimensional real vector space. However, the axis of a rotation in three dimensions is always an invariant subspace.

=== 1-dimensional subspaces ===
If U is a 1-dimensional invariant subspace for operator T with vector v ∈ U, then the vectors v and Tv must be linearly dependent. Thus
$$\forall\mathbf{v}\in U\;\exists\alpha\in\mathbb{R}: T\mathbf{v}=\alpha\mathbf{v}\text{.}$$
In fact, the scalar α does not depend on v.

The equation above formulates an eigenvalue problem. Any eigenvector for T spans a 1-dimensional invariant subspace, and vice-versa. In particular, a nonzero invariant vector (i.e. a fixed point of T) spans an invariant subspace of dimension 1.

As a consequence of the fundamental theorem of algebra, every linear operator on a nonzero finite-dimensional complex vector space has an eigenvector. Therefore, every such linear operator in at least two dimensions has a proper non-trivial invariant subspace.

== Diagonalization via projections ==
Determining whether a given subspace W is invariant under T is ostensibly a problem of geometric nature. Matrix representation allows one to phrase this problem algebraically.

Write V as the direct sum W ⊕ W′; a suitable W′ can always be chosen by extending a basis of W. The associated projection operator P onto W has matrix representation

$$P = \begin{bmatrix} 1 & 0 \\ 0 & 0 \end{bmatrix} : \begin{matrix}W \\ \oplus \\ W' \end{matrix} \rightarrow \begin{matrix}W \\ \oplus \\ W' \end{matrix}.$$

A straightforward calculation shows that W is T-invariant if and only if PTP = TP.

If 1 is the identity operator, then 1-P is projection onto W′. The equation TP = PT holds if and only if both im(P) and im(1 − P) are invariant under T. In that case, T has matrix representation
$$T = \begin{bmatrix} T_{11} & 0 \\ 0 & T_{22} \end{bmatrix} : \begin{matrix} \operatorname{im}(P) \\ \oplus \\ \operatorname{im}(1-P) \end{matrix} \rightarrow  \begin{matrix} \operatorname{im}(P) \\ \oplus \\ \operatorname{im}(1-P) \end{matrix} \;.$$

Colloquially, a projection that commutes with T "diagonalizes" T.

== Lattice of subspaces ==
As the above examples indicate, the invariant subspaces of a given linear transformation T shed light on the structure of T. When V is a finite-dimensional vector space over an algebraically closed field, linear transformations acting on V are characterized (up to similarity) by the Jordan canonical form, which decomposes V into invariant subspaces of T. Many fundamental questions regarding T can be translated to questions about invariant subspaces of T.

The set of T-invariant subspaces of V is sometimes called the invariant-subspace lattice of T and written Lat(T). As the name suggests, it is a (modular) lattice, with meets and joins given by (respectively) set intersection and linear span. A minimal element in Lat(T) in said to be a minimal invariant subspace.

In the study of infinite-dimensional operators, Lat(T) is sometimes restricted to only the closed invariant subspaces.

== For multiple operators ==
Given a collection T of operators, a subspace is called T-invariant if it is invariant under each T ∈ T.

As in the single-operator case, the invariant-subspace lattice of T, written Lat(T), is the set of all T-invariant subspaces, and bears the same meet and join operations. Set-theoretically, it is the intersection
$$\mathrm{Lat}(\mathcal{T})=\bigcap_{T\in\mathcal{T}}{\mathrm{Lat}(T)}\text{.}$$

=== Examples ===
Let End(V) be the set of all linear operators on V. Then Lat(End(V))={0,V}.

Given a representation of a group G on a vector space V, we have a linear transformation T(g) : V → V for every element g of G. If a subspace W of V is invariant with respect to all these transformations, then it is a subrepresentation and the group G acts on W in a natural way. The same construction applies to representations of an algebra.

As another example, let T ∈ End(V) and Σ be the algebra generated by {1, T }, where 1 is the identity operator. Then Lat(T) = Lat(Σ).

=== Fundamental theorem of noncommutative algebra ===
Just as the fundamental theorem of algebra ensures that every linear transformation acting on a finite-dimensional complex vector space has a non-trivial invariant subspace, the fundamental theorem of noncommutative algebra asserts that Lat(Σ) contains non-trivial elements for certain Σ.

Theorem (Burnside)—Assume V is a complex vector space of finite dimension. For every proper subalgebra Σ of End(V), Lat(Σ) contains a non-trivial element.

One consequence is that every commuting family in L(V) can be simultaneously upper-triangularized. To see this, note that an upper-triangular matrix representation corresponds to a flag of invariant subspaces, that a commuting family generates a commuting algebra, and that End(V) is not commutative when dim(V) ≥ 2.

== Left ideals ==
If A is an algebra, one can define a left regular representation Φ on A: Φ(a)b = ab is a homomorphism from A to L(A), the algebra of linear transformations on A

The invariant subspaces of Φ are precisely the left ideals of A. A left ideal M of A gives a subrepresentation of A on M.

If M is a left ideal of A then the left regular representation Φ on M now descends to a representation Φ' on the quotient vector space A/M. If [b] denotes an equivalence class in A/M, Φ'(a)[b] = [ab]. The kernel of the representation Φ' is the set {a ∈ A | ab ∈ M for all b}.

The representation Φ' is irreducible if and only if M is a maximal left ideal, since a subspace V ⊂ A/M is an invariant under {Φ'(a) | a ∈ A} if and only if its preimage under the quotient map, V + M, is a left ideal in A.

== Invariant subspace problem ==
The invariant subspace problem concerns the case where V is a separable Hilbert space over the complex numbers, of dimension > 1, and T is a bounded operator. The problem is to decide whether every such T has a non-trivial, closed, invariant subspace. It is unsolved.

In the more general case where V is assumed to be a Banach space, Per Enflo (1976) found an example of an operator without an invariant subspace. A concrete example of an operator without an invariant subspace was produced in 1985 by Charles Read.

== Almost-invariant halfspaces ==
Related to invariant subspaces are so-called almost-invariant-halfspaces (AIHS's). A closed subspace $Y$ of a Banach space $X$ is said to be almost-invariant under an operator $T \in \mathcal{B}(X)$ if $TY \subseteq Y+E$ for some finite-dimensional subspace $E$; equivalently, $Y$ is almost-invariant under $T$ if there is a finite-rank operator $F \in \mathcal{B}(X)$ such that $(T+F)Y \subseteq Y$, i.e. if $Y$ is invariant (in the usual sense) under $T+F$. In this case, the minimum possible dimension of $E$ (or rank of $F$) is called the defect.

Clearly, every finite-dimensional and finite-codimensional subspace is almost-invariant under every operator. Thus, to make things non-trivial, we say that $Y$ is a halfspace whenever it is a closed subspace with infinite dimension and infinite codimension.

The AIHS problem asks whether every operator admits an AIHS. In the complex setting it has already been solved; that is, if $X$ is a complex infinite-dimensional Banach space and $T \in \mathcal{B}(X)$ then $T$ admits an AIHS of defect at most 1. It is not currently known whether the same holds if $X$ is a real Banach space. However, some partial results have been established: for instance, any self-adjoint operator on an infinite-dimensional real Hilbert space admits an AIHS, as does any strictly singular (or compact) operator acting on a real infinite-dimensional reflexive space.

== See also ==
- Invariant manifold
- Lomonosov's invariant subspace theorem

== Sources ==
- Abramovich, Yuri A.; Aliprantis, Charalambos D. (2002). An Invitation to Operator Theory. American Mathematical Society. ISBN 978-0-8218-2146-6.
- Beauzamy, Bernard (1988). Introduction to Operator Theory and Invariant Subspaces. North Holland.
- Enflo, Per; Lomonosov, Victor (2001). "Some aspects of the invariant subspace problem". Handbook of the geometry of Banach spaces. Vol. I. Amsterdam: North-Holland. pp. 533–559.
- Gohberg, Israel; Lancaster, Peter; Rodman, Leiba (2006). Invariant Subspaces of Matrices with Applications. Classics in Applied Mathematics. Vol. 51 (Reprint, with list of errata and new preface, of the 1986 Wiley ed.). Society for Industrial and Applied Mathematics (SIAM). pp. xxii+692. ISBN 978-0-89871-608-5.
- Lyubich, Yurii I. (1988). Introduction to the Theory of Banach Representations of Groups (Translated from the 1985 Russian-language ed.). Kharkov, Ukraine: Birkhäuser Verlag.
- Radjavi, Heydar; Rosenthal, Peter (2003). Invariant Subspaces (Update of 1973 Springer-Verlag ed.). Dover Publications. ISBN 0-486-42822-2.
- Roman, Stephen (2008). Advanced Linear Algebra. Graduate Texts in Mathematics (Third ed.). Springer. ISBN 978-0-387-72828-5.
