= Rahul Nandkishore =

Physicist and academic

- Occupations: Physicist and academic

Academic background
- Education: BA., Natural Sciences; MS., Natural Sciences; PhD., Physics
- Alma mater: Trinity College, Cambridge; Massachusetts Institute of Technology
- Thesis: Quantum many-body physics in single and bilayer graphene (2012)

Academic work
- Institutions: University of Colorado

Rahul Nandkishore is a physicist and academic. He is a professor of physics and fellow of the Center for Theory of Quantum Matter at the University of Colorado, Boulder.

Nandkishore is most known for his research on statistical physics, condensed matter theory, graphene and Dirac semimetals, many-body localization, fracton phases of matter, and constrained quantum dynamics. He is the recipient of the U.S. Air Force Office of Sponsored Research Young Investigator Award in 2016, the Alfred P. Sloan Fellowship Award U.S. Army Research Office Young Investigator Award in 2017, and Simons Fellowship in Theoretical Physics in 2021.

== Education ==
Nandkishore earned a Bachelor's degree in Natural Sciences from Trinity College, Cambridge, where he also received a Master's degree in Natural Sciences in 2008. He obtained a Ph.D. in Physics from the Massachusetts Institute of Technology in 2012, then joined Princeton University as a Postdoctoral fellow, remaining there until 2015.

== Career ==
Nandkishore began his academic career as an Assistant Professor of Physics at the University of Colorado, Boulder in 2015, and was appointed Associate Professor in 2019. Additionally, he served as Visiting Associate Professor of Physics at Stanford University in 2022. He also created a Massive Open Online Course on Coursera, entitled Introduction to Condensed Matter Physics. He has been a Fellow of the Center for Theory of Quantum Matter (CTQM) at the University of Colorado, Boulder since 2015 and at one point served as the director of the CTQM. Nandkishore was promoted to full professor by the University of Colorado, Boulder in 2025.

== Research ==
Nandkishore has made contributions to the field of physics through his research in statistical physics, condensed matter theory, correlated phases in graphene, many-body localization, fractionalized phases, constrained quantum dynamics and Dirac semimetals.

Nandkishore is most known for his work on correlated and disordered systems, in particular for his work identifying a new route to chiral superconductivity in hexagonal lattice systems near Van Hove filling, for his work on disorder effects in Weyl semimetals, and for his work using nonlinear spectroscopy to infer and explain intrinsic lifetimes of dipolar excitations in doped Silicon. He is also known for his work in statistical mechanics, especially for his introduction of the concept of localization protected order, for the discovery of non-local response in localized systems, now known as the KNS effect, and for the extension of many body localization to certain long range interacting systems. In addition, he founded the study of fracton dynamics, including new routes to ergodicity breaking and new hydrodynamic universality classes, both effects that have been observed in experiments.

== Awards and honors ==
- 2016 – Young Investigator Award, U.S. Air Force Office of Sponsored Research
- 2017 – Sloan Research Fellowship, Alfred P. Sloan Foundation
- 2017 – Young Investigator Award, U.S. Army Research Office
- 2021 – Simons Fellowship in Theoretical Physics, Simons Foundation

== Selected articles ==
- Nandkishore, R., Levitov, L. S., & Chubukov, A. V. (2012). Chiral superconductivity from repulsive interactions in doped graphene. Nature Physics, 8(2), 158-163.
- Huse, D. A., Nandkishore, R., Oganesyan, V., Pal, A., & Sondhi, S. L. (2013). Localization-protected quantum order. Physical Review B, 88(1), 014206.
- Huse, D. A., Nandkishore, R., & Oganesyan, V. (2014). Phenomenology of fully many-body-localized systems. Physical Review B, 90(17), 174202.
- Nandkishore, R., & Huse, D. A. (2015). Many-body localization and thermalization in quantum statistical mechanics. Annu. Rev. Condens. Matter Phys., 6(1), 15-38.
- Nandkishore, R. M., & Hermele, M. (2019). Fractons. Annual Review of Condensed Matter Physics, 10, 295-313.
- Khemani, V., Hermele, M., & Nandkishore, R. (2020). Localization from Hilbert space shattering: From theory to physical realizations. Physical Review B, 101(17), 174204.
