= Thermalisation =

Tendency of bodies towards thermal equilibrium

In physics, thermalisation (or thermalization) is the process of physical bodies reaching thermal equilibrium through mutual interaction. In general, the natural tendency of a system is towards a state of equipartition of energy and uniform temperature that maximizes the system's entropy. Thermalisation, thermal equilibrium, and temperature are therefore important fundamental concepts within statistical physics, statistical mechanics, and thermodynamics; all of which are a basis for many other specific fields of scientific understanding and engineering application.

Examples of thermalisation include:

- the achievement of equilibrium in a plasma.
- the process undergone by high-energy neutrons as they lose energy by collision with a moderator.
- the process of heat or phonon emission by charge carriers in a solar cell, after a photon that exceeds the semiconductor band gap energy is absorbed.

The hypothesis, foundational to most introductory textbooks treating quantum statistical mechanics, assumes that systems go to thermal equilibrium (thermalisation). The process of thermalisation erases local memory of the initial conditions. The eigenstate thermalisation hypothesis is a hypothesis about when quantum states will undergo thermalisation and why.

Not all quantum states undergo thermalisation. Some states have been discovered which do not (see below), and their reasons for not reaching thermal equilibrium are unclear as of March 2019.

== Theoretical description ==
The process of equilibration can be described using the H-theorem or the relaxation theorem, see also entropy production.

== Systems resisting thermalisation ==
=== Classical systems ===
Broadly-speaking, classical systems with non-chaotic behavior will not thermalise. Systems with many interacting constituents are generally expected to be chaotic, but this assumption sometimes fails. A notable counter example is the Fermi–Pasta–Ulam–Tsingou problem, which displays unexpected recurrence and will only thermalise over very long time scales. Non-chaotic systems which are perturbed by weak non-linearities will not thermalise for a set of initial conditions, with non-zero volume in the phase space, as stated by the KAM theorem, although the size of this set decreases exponentially with the number of degrees of freedom. Many-body integrable systems, which have an extensive number of conserved quantities, will not thermalise in the usual sense, but will equilibrate according to a generalized Gibbs ensemble.

=== Quantum systems ===
Some such phenomena resisting the tendency to thermalize include (see, e.g., a quantum scar):

- Conventional quantum scars, which refer to eigenstates with enhanced probability density along unstable periodic orbits much higher than one would intuitively predict from classical mechanics.
- Perturbation-induced quantum scarring: despite the similarity in appearance to conventional scarring, these scars have a novel underlying mechanism stemming from the combined effect of nearly-degenerate states and spatially localized perturbations, and they can be employed to propagate quantum wave packets in a disordered quantum dot with high fidelity.
- Many-body quantum scars.
- Many-body localisation (MBL), quantum many-body systems retaining memory of their initial condition in local observables for arbitrary amounts of time.

Other systems that resist thermalisation and are better understood are quantum integrable systems and systems with dynamical symmetries.
