= Krzysztof Sacha =

Polish physicist

- Born: Krzysztof Sacha; September 2, 1970 (age 55); Poland
- Citizenship: Polish
- Education: Jagiellonian University
- Known for: Time crystal
- Spouse: Ewa Sacha
- Children: Aleksandra and Wojciech
- Scientific career
- Fields: Physics
- Workplaces: Jagiellonian University
- Thesis: (1998)
- Doctoral advisor: Prof. Jakub Zakrzewski
- Website: chaos.if.uj.edu.pl

Krzysztof Sacha (born September 2, 1970) is a Polish theoretical physicist. He is currently Professor of Physics at the Jagiellonian University in Cracow.

== Personal life ==
Krzysztof Sacha was born on September 2, 1970, in Kłodzko together with his twin brother Jerzy Sacha. In 1996 he married Ewa, with whom he has two children Aleksandra and Wojciech.

== Education ==
He received a Master of Science in Physics in 1995 and a Ph.D. in Physics in 1998, both with distinction, from Jagiellonian University. In 1999 he was given Award of Ministry of Polish Education for PhD thesis. He continued his work in Jagiellonian University, in 1999-2000 in Philipps University Marburg with Fellowship of the Alexander von Humboldt Foundation, and in 2005-2006 in Los Alamos National Laboratory with Fulbright Fellowship. In 2004 he earned Habilitation in physics in Jagiellonian University and in 2011 he was awarded title of Professor of Physics.

== Research ==
Krzysztof Sacha researches atomic physics. He is known for his work on Bose–Einstein condensate fluctuations, solitons, Eckhardt-Sacha model of nonsequential triple ionization, first proposal of symmetry breaking of discrete time translation symmetry - Time crystals and many other works on dynamical phases of matter

== Recognition ==
In 2024, Sacha received the Prize of the Foundation for Polish Science in the field of mathematics, physics, and engineering for his works on for the formulation of the theory of time crystals.
