= Time crystal =

Structure that repeats in time; a novel type or phase of non-equilibrium matter

In condensed matter physics, a time crystal is a quantum system of particles whose lowest-energy state is one in which the particles are in repetitive motion. The system cannot lose energy to the environment and come to rest because it is already in its quantum ground state. Time crystals were first proposed theoretically by Alfred Shapere and Frank Wilczek in 2012 as a time-based analogue to common crystals – whereas the atoms in crystals are arranged periodically in space, the atoms in a time crystal are arranged periodically in both space and time. Several different groups have demonstrated matter with stable periodic evolution in systems that are periodically driven. In terms of practical use, time crystals may one day be used as quantum computer memory.

The existence of crystals in nature is a manifestation of spontaneous symmetry breaking, which occurs when the lowest-energy state of a system is less symmetrical than the equations governing the system. In the crystal ground state, the continuous translational symmetry in space is broken and replaced by the lower discrete symmetry of the periodic crystal. As the laws of physics are symmetrical under continuous translations in time as well as space, the question arose in 2012 as to whether it is possible to break symmetry temporally, and thus create a "time crystal".

If a discrete time-translation symmetry is broken (which may be realized in periodically driven systems), then the system is referred to as a discrete time crystal. A discrete time crystal never reaches thermal equilibrium, as it is a type (or phase) of non-equilibrium matter. Breaking of time symmetry can occur only in non-equilibrium systems. Discrete time crystals have in fact been observed in physics laboratories as early as 2016. One example of a time crystal, which demonstrates non-equilibrium, broken time symmetry is a constantly rotating ring of charged ions in an otherwise lowest-energy state.

== Concept ==
Ordinary (non-time) crystals form through spontaneous symmetry breaking related to spatial symmetry. Such processes can produce materials with interesting properties, such as diamonds, salt crystals, and ferromagnetic metals. By analogy, a time crystal arises through the spontaneous breaking of a time-translation symmetry. A time crystal can be informally defined as a time-periodic self-organizing structure. While an ordinary crystal is periodic (has a repeating structure) in space, a time crystal has a repeating structure in time. A time crystal is periodic in time in the same sense that the pendulum in a pendulum-driven clock is periodic in time. Unlike a pendulum, a time crystal "spontaneously" self-organizes into robust periodic motion (breaking a temporal symmetry).

=== Time-translation symmetry ===
Symmetries in nature lead directly to conservation laws, something which is precisely formulated by Noether's theorem.

The basic idea of time-translation symmetry is that a translation in time has no effect on physical laws, i.e. that the laws of nature that apply today were the same in the past and will be the same in the future. This symmetry implies the conservation of energy.

=== Broken symmetry in normal crystals ===
Normal process (N-process) and Umklapp process (U-process). While the N-process conserves total phonon momentum, the U-process changes phonon momentum.

Common crystals exhibit broken translation symmetry: they have repeated patterns in space and are not invariant under arbitrary translations or rotations. The laws of physics are unchanged by arbitrary translations and rotations. However, if we hold fixed the atoms of a crystal, the dynamics of an electron or other particle in the crystal depend on how it moves relative to the crystal, and particle momentum can change by interacting with the atoms of a crystal—for example in Umklapp processes. Quasimomentum, however, is conserved in a perfect crystal.

Time crystals show a broken symmetry analogous to a discrete space-translation symmetry breaking. For example, the molecules of a liquid freezing on the surface of a crystal can align with the molecules of the crystal, but with a pattern less symmetric than the crystal: it breaks the initial symmetry. This broken symmetry exhibits three important characteristics:

1. the system has a lower symmetry than the underlying arrangement of the crystal,
2. the system exhibits spatial and temporal long-range order (unlike a local and intermittent order in a liquid near the surface of a crystal),
3. it is the result of interactions between the constituents of the system, which align themselves relative to each other.

=== Broken symmetry in discrete time crystals (DTC) ===
Time crystals seem to break time-translation symmetry and have repeated patterns in time even if the laws of the system are invariant by translation of time. The time crystals that are experimentally realized show discrete time-translation symmetry breaking, not the continuous one: they are periodically driven systems oscillating at a fraction of the frequency of the driving force. (According to Philip Ball, DTC are so-called because "their periodicity is a discrete, integer multiple of the driving period".)

The initial symmetry, which is the discrete time-translation symmetry ($t \to t + nT$) with $n=1$, is spontaneously broken to the lower discrete time-translation symmetry with $n>1$, where $t$ is time, $T$ the driving period, $n$ an integer.

Many systems can show behaviors of spontaneous time-translation symmetry breaking but may not be discrete (or Floquet) time crystals: convection cells, oscillating chemical reactions, aerodynamic flutter, and subharmonic response to a periodic driving force such as the Faraday instability, NMR spin echos, parametric down-conversion, and period-doubled nonlinear dynamical systems.

However, discrete (or Floquet) time crystals are unique in that they follow a strict definition of discrete time-translation symmetry breaking:

- it is a broken symmetry – the system shows oscillations with a period longer than the driving force,
- the system is in crypto-equilibrium – these oscillations generate no entropy, and a time-dependent frame can be found in which the system is indistinguishable from an equilibrium when measured stroboscopically (which is not the case of convection cells, oscillating chemical reactions and aerodynamic flutter),
- the system exhibits long-range order – the oscillations are in phase (synchronized) over arbitrarily long distances and time.

Moreover, the broken symmetry in time crystals is the result of many-body interactions: the order is the consequence of a collective process, just like in spatial crystals. This is not the case for NMR spin echos.

These characteristics makes discrete time crystals analogous to spatial crystals as described above and may be considered a novel type or phase of nonequilibrium matter.

== Thermodynamics ==
Time crystals do not violate the laws of thermodynamics: energy in the overall system is conserved, such a crystal does not spontaneously convert thermal energy into mechanical work, and it cannot serve as a perpetual store of work. But it may change perpetually in a fixed pattern in time for as long as the system can be maintained. They possess "motion without energy"—their apparent motion does not represent conventional kinetic energy. Recent experimental advances in probing discrete time crystals in their periodically driven nonequilibrium states have led to the beginning exploration of novel phases of nonequilibrium matter.

Time crystals do not evade the second law of thermodynamics, although they spontaneously break "time-translation symmetry", the usual rule that a stable object will remain the same throughout time. In thermodynamics, a time crystal's entropy, understood as a measure of disorder in a system, stays constant over time, which barely satisfies the second law of thermodynamics by not decreasing.

== History ==
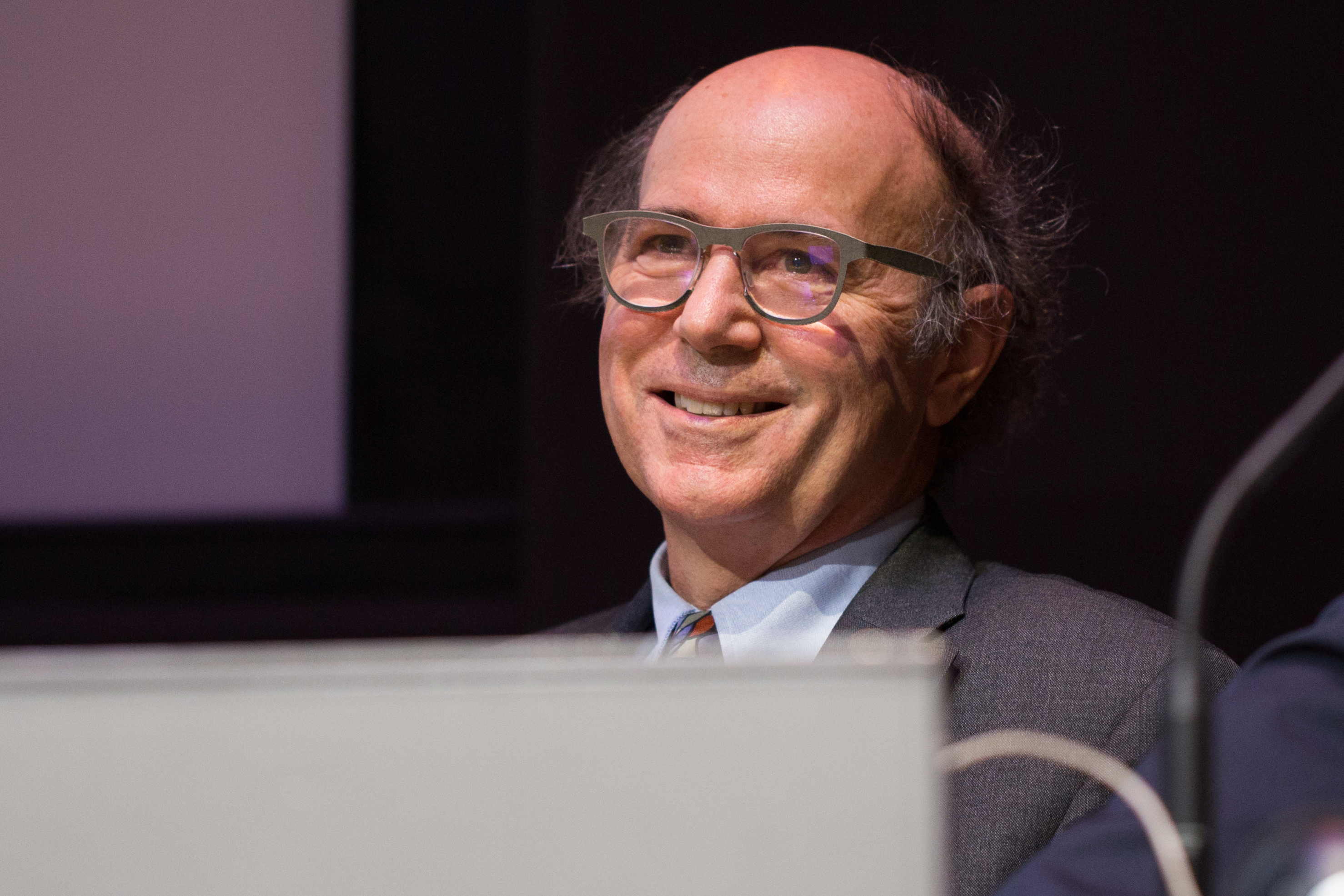
Nobel laureate Frank Wilczek at University of Paris-Saclay

The idea of a quantized time crystal was theorized in 2012 by Alfred Shapere and Frank Wilczek, a Nobel laureate and professor at MIT. In 2013, Xiang Zhang, a nanoengineer at University of California, Berkeley, and his team proposed creating a time crystal in the form of a constantly rotating ring of charged ions.

In response to Wilczek and Zhang, Patrick Bruno (European Synchrotron Radiation Facility) and Masaki Oshikawa (University of Tokyo) published several articles stating that space–time crystals were impossible.

Subsequent work developed more precise definitions of time-translation symmetry-breaking, which ultimately led to the Watanabe–Oshikawa "no-go" statement that quantum space–time crystals in equilibrium are not possible. Later work restricted the scope of Watanabe and Oshikawa: strictly speaking, they showed that long-range order in both space and time is not possible in equilibrium, but breaking of time-translation symmetry alone is still possible.

Several realizations of time crystals, which avoid the equilibrium no-go arguments, were later proposed. In 2014 Krzysztof Sacha at Jagiellonian University in Kraków predicted the behaviour of discrete time crystals in a periodically driven system with "an ultracold atomic cloud bouncing on an oscillating mirror".

In 2016, research groups at Princeton and at Santa Barbara independently suggested that periodically driven quantum spin systems could show similar behaviour. Also in 2016, Norman Yao at Berkeley and colleagues proposed a different way to create discrete time crystals in spin systems. These ideas were successful and independently realized by two experimental teams: a group led by Harvard's Mikhail Lukin and a group led by Christopher Monroe at University of Maryland. Both experiments were published in the same issue of Nature in March 2017.

Later, time crystals in open systems, so-called "dissipative time crystals," were proposed in several platforms breaking a discrete and a continuous time-translation symmetry. A dissipative time crystal was experimentally realized for the first time in 2021 by the group of Andreas Hemmerich at the Institute of Laser Physics at the University of Hamburg. The researchers used a Bose–Einstein condensate strongly coupled to a dissipative optical cavity and the time crystal was demonstrated to spontaneously break discrete time-translation symmetry by periodically switching between two atomic density patterns. In an earlier experiment in the group of Tilman Esslinger at ETH Zurich, limit cycle dynamics was observed in 2019, but evidence of robustness against perturbations and the spontaneous character of the time-translation symmetry breaking were not addressed.

In 2019, physicists Valerii Kozin and Oleksandr Kyriienko proved that, in theory, a permanent quantum time crystal can exist as an isolated system if the system contains unusual long-range multiparticle interactions. The original "no-go" argument only holds in the presence of typical short-range fields that decay as quickly as r^{−α} for some α > 0. Kozin and Kyriienko instead analyzed a spin-1/2 many-body Hamiltonian with long-range multispin interactions, and showed it broke continuous time-translational symmetry. Certain spin correlations in the system oscillate in time, despite the system being closed and in a ground energy state. However, demonstrating such a system in practice might be prohibitively difficult, and concerns about the physicality of the long-range nature of the model have been raised.

The first experimental observation of a continuous time crystal was reported in 2022 by Hans Keßler, Andreas Hemmerich, and collaborators at the University of Hamburg, using a continuous pump laser to drive a Bose–Einstein condensate in an optical cavity, where the system responded with an intrinsic oscillation between two bistable ground states. In 2024, Alejandro Fainstein, Paulo Santos, and collaborators at the Instituto Balseiro and Paul Drude Institute reported a solid-state continuous time crystal in a driven-dissipative exciton–polariton condensate in a semiconductor microcavity, with its time-crystalline oscillations synchronized to self-sustained mechanical vibrations of the cavity. The oscillation frequency also exhibited period doubling relative to the self-induced phonons, corresponding to a discrete time-crystal transition.

== Experiments ==
In October 2016, Christopher Monroe at the University of Maryland claimed to have created the world's first discrete time crystal. Using the ideas proposed by Yao et al., his team trapped a chain of ^{171}Yb^{+} ions in a Paul trap, confined by radio-frequency electromagnetic fields. One of the two spin states was selected by a pair of laser beams. The lasers were pulsed, with the shape of the pulse controlled by an acousto-optic modulator, using the Tukey window to avoid too much energy at the wrong optical frequency. The hyperfine electron states in that setup, ^{2}S_{1/2} |F = 0, m_{F} = 0⟩ and |F = 1, m_{F} = 0⟩, have very close energy levels, separated by 12.642831 GHz. Ten Doppler-cooled ions were placed in a line 0.025 mm long and coupled together.

The researchers observed a subharmonic oscillation of the drive. The experiment showed "rigidity" of the time crystal, where the oscillation frequency remained unchanged even when the time crystal was perturbed, and that it gained a frequency of its own and vibrated according to it (rather than only the frequency of the drive). However, once the perturbation or frequency of vibration grew too strong, the time crystal "melted" and lost this subharmonic oscillation, and it returned to the same state as before where it moved only with the induced frequency.

Also in 2016, Mikhail Lukin at Harvard also reported the creation of a driven time crystal. His group used a diamond crystal doped with a high concentration of nitrogen-vacancy centers, which have strong dipole–dipole coupling and relatively long-lived spin coherence. This strongly interacting dipolar spin system was driven with microwave fields, and the ensemble spin state was determined with an optical (laser) field. It was observed that the spin polarization evolved at half the frequency of the microwave drive. The oscillations persisted for over 100 cycles. This subharmonic response to the drive frequency is seen as a signature of time-crystalline order.

In May 2018, a group in Aalto University reported that they had observed the formation of a time quasicrystal and its phase transition to a continuous time crystal in a Helium-3 superfluid cooled to within one ten thousandth of a kelvin from absolute zero (0.0001 K). On August 17, 2020 Nature Materials published a letter from the same group saying that for the first time they were able to observe interactions and the flow of constituent particles between two time crystals.

In February 2021, a team at Max Planck Institute for Intelligent Systems described the creation of time crystal consisting of magnons and probed them under scanning transmission X-ray microscopy to capture the recurring periodic magnetization structure in the first known video record of such type.

In July 2021, a team led by Andreas Hemmerich at the Institute of Laser Physics at the University of Hamburg presented the first realization of a time crystal in an open system, a so-called dissipative time crystal using ultracold atoms coupled to an optical cavity. The main achievement of this work is a positive application of dissipation – actually helping to stabilise the system's dynamics.

In November 2021, a collaboration between Google and physicists from multiple universities reported the observation of a discrete time crystal on Google's Sycamore processor, a quantum computing device. A chip of 20 qubits was used to obtain a many-body localization configuration of up and down spins and then stimulated with a laser to achieve a periodically driven "Floquet" system where all up spins are flipped for down and vice-versa in periodic cycles which are multiples of the laser's frequency. While the laser is necessary to maintain the necessary environmental conditions, no energy is absorbed from the laser, so the system remains in a protected eigenstate order.

Previously in June and November 2021 other teams had obtained virtual time crystals based on floquet systems under similar principles to those of the Google experiment, but on quantum simulators rather than quantum processors: first a group at the University of Maryland obtained time crystals on trapped-ions qubits using high frequency driving rather than many-body localization and then a collaboration between TU Delft and TNO in the Netherlands called Qutech created time crystals from nuclear spins in carbon-13 nitrogen-vacancy (NV) centers on a diamond, attaining longer times but fewer qubits.

In February 2022, a scientist at UC Riverside reported a dissipative time crystal akin to the system of July 2021 but all-optical, which allowed the scientist to operate it at room temperature. In this experiment injection locking was used to direct lasers at a specific frequency inside a microresonator creating a lattice trap for solitons at subharmonic frequencies.

In March 2022, a new experiment studying time crystals on a quantum processor was performed by two physicists at the University of Melbourne, this time using IBM's Manhattan and Brooklyn quantum processors observing a total of 57 qubits.

In June 2022, the observation of a continuous time crystal was reported by a team at the Institute of Laser Physics at the University of Hamburg, supervised by Hans Keßler and Andreas Hemmerich. In periodically driven systems, time-translation symmetry is broken into a discrete time-translation symmetry due to the drive. Discrete time crystals break this discrete time-translation symmetry by oscillating at a multiple of the drive frequency. In the new experiment, the drive (pump laser) was operated continuously, thus respecting the continuous time-translation symmetry. Instead of a subharmonic response, the system showed an oscillation with an intrinsic frequency and a time phase taking random values between 0 and 2π, as expected for spontaneous breaking of continuous time-translation symmetry. Moreover, the observed limit cycle oscillations were shown to be robust against perturbations of technical or fundamental character, such as quantum noise and, due to the openness of the system, fluctuations associated with dissipation. The system consisted of a Bose–Einstein condensate in an optical cavity, which was pumped with an optical standing wave oriented perpendicularly with regard to the cavity axis and was in a superradiant phase localizing at two bistable ground states between which it oscillated.

In May 2024, a team led by Alejandro Fainstein (Instituto Balseiro and Centro Atómico Bariloche, Argentina) and Paulo Santos (Paul Drude Institute, Germany) reported a solid-state continuous time crystal in a driven-dissipative microcavity exciton-polariton condensate with a built-in mechanical clock. The platform consisted of a (Ga,Al)As semiconductor microcavity with GaAs quantum wells in the spacer, pumped by a non-resonant continuous-wave laser that created an incoherent particle bath which relaxed into a Bose–Einstein condensate of lower polaritons. For increasing power of a non-circularly polarized excitation, the condensate pseudo-spin spontaneously underwent Larmor-like precession without an external magnetic field or pulsed drive, a signature of a continuous time crystal. The precession frequency could be controlled by the excitation power and locked to self-sustained coherent breathing vibrations of the microcavity at about 20 GHz, stabilizing the time crystal. At higher drive powers, the system exhibited period doubling relative to the phonon frequency, realizing a discrete time crystal phase under continuous excitation in the same device.

In February 2024, a team from Dortmund University in Germany built a time crystal from indium gallium arsenide that lasted for 40 minutes, nearly 10 million times longer than the previous record of around 5 milliseconds. In addition, the lack of any decay suggests the crystal could have lasted even longer, stating that it could last "at least a few hours, perhaps even longer".

In March 2025, researchers at TU Dortmund University observed complex nonlinear behavior in a semiconductor-based time crystal made of indium gallium arsenide. By periodically driving the system with laser pulses, they uncovered transitions from synchronized oscillations to chaotic motion. The system exhibited structures such as the Farey tree sequence and the devil's staircase—patterns never before seen in semiconductor time crystals—offering new insights into dynamic phase transitions and chaos in driven quantum systems.
