= Localization-protected quantum order =

Phenomenon in thermal physics

Many-body localization (MBL) is a dynamical phenomenon which leads to the breakdown of equilibrium statistical mechanics in isolated many-body systems. Such systems never reach local thermal equilibrium, and retain local memory of their initial conditions for infinite times. One can still define a notion of phase structure in these out-of-equilibrium systems. Strikingly, MBL can even enable new kinds of exotic orders that are disallowed in thermal equilibrium – a phenomenon that goes by the name of localization-protected quantum order (LPQO) or eigenstate order.

== Background ==
The study of phases of matter and the transitions between them has been a central enterprise in physics for well over a century. One of the earliest paradigms for elucidating phase structure, associated most with Landau, classifies phases according to the spontaneous breaking of global symmetries present in a physical system. More recently, we have also made great strides in understanding topological phases of matter which lie outside Landau's framework: the order in topological phases cannot be characterized by local patterns of symmetry breaking, and is instead encoded in global patterns of quantum entanglement.

All of this remarkable progress rests on the foundation of equilibrium statistical mechanics. Phases and phase transitions are only sharply defined for macroscopic systems in the thermodynamic limit, and statistical mechanics allows us to make useful predictions about such macroscopic systems with many (~ 10^{23}) constituent particles. A fundamental assumption of statistical mechanics is that systems generically reach a state of thermal equilibrium (such as the Gibbs state) which can be characterized by only a few parameters such as temperature or a chemical potential. Traditionally, phase structure is studied by examining the behavior of "order parameters" in equilibrium states. At zero temperature, these are evaluated in the ground state of the system, and different phases correspond to different quantum orders (topological or otherwise). Thermal equilibrium strongly constrains the allowed orders at finite temperatures. In general, thermal fluctuations at finite temperatures reduce the long-ranged quantum correlations present in ordered phases and, in lower dimensions, can destroy order altogether. As an example, the Peierls-Mermin-Wagner theorems prove that a one dimensional system cannot spontaneously break a continuous symmetry at any non-zero temperature.

Recent progress on the phenomenon of many-body localization has revealed classes of generic (typically disordered) many-body systems which never reach local thermal equilibrium, and thus lie outside the framework of equilibrium statistical mechanics. MBL systems can undergo a dynamical phase transition to a thermalizing phase as parameters such as the disorder or interaction strength are tuned, and the nature of the MBL-to-thermal phase transition is an active area of research. The existence of MBL raises the interesting question of whether one can have different kinds of MBL phases, just as there are different kinds of thermalizing phases. Remarkably, the answer is affirmative, and out-of-equilibrium systems can also display a rich phase structure. What's more, the suppression of thermal fluctuations in localized systems can even allow for new kinds of order that are forbidden in equilibrium—which is the essence of localization-protected quantum order. The recent discovery of time-crystals in periodically driven MBL systems is a notable example of this phenomenon.

== Phases out of equilibrium: eigenstate order ==
Studying phase structure in localized systems requires us to first formulate a sharp notion of a phase away from thermal equilibrium. This is done via the notion of eigenstate order: one can measure order parameters and correlation functions in individual energy eigenstates of a many-body system, instead of averaging over several eigenstates as in a Gibbs state. The key point is that individual eigenstates can show patterns of order that may be invisible to thermodynamic averages over eigenstates. Indeed, a thermodynamic ensemble average isn't even appropriate in MBL systems since they never reach thermal equilibrium. What's more, while individual eigenstates aren't themselves experimentally accessible, order in eigenstates nevertheless has measurable dynamical signatures. The eigenspectrum properties change in a singular fashion as the system transitions between from one type of MBL phase to another, or from an MBL phase to a thermal one---again with measurable dynamical signatures.

When considering eigenstate order in MBL systems, one generally speaks of highly excited eigenstates at energy densities that would correspond to high or infinite temperatures if the system were able to thermalize. In a thermalizing system, the temperature is defined via $T = \left ( \frac{dS}{dE} \right )^{-1}$ where the entropy $S$ is maximized near the middle of the many-body spectrum (corresponding to $T=\infty$) and vanishes near the edges of the spectrum (corresponding to $T=0^{\pm}$). Thus, "infinite temperature eigenstates" are those drawn from near the middle of the spectrum, and it more correct to refer to energy-densities rather than temperatures since temperature is only defined in equilibrium. In MBL systems, the suppression of thermal fluctuations means that the properties of highly excited eigenstates are similar, in many respects, to those of ground states of gapped local Hamiltonians. This enables various forms of ground state order to be promoted to finite energy densities.

We note that in thermalizing MB systems, the notion of eigenstate order is congruent with the usual definition of phases. This is because the eigenstate thermalization hypothesis (ETH) implies that local observables (such as order parameters) computed in individual eigenstates agree with those computed in the Gibbs state at a temperature appropriate to the energy density of the eigenstate. On the other hand, MBL systems do not obey the ETH and nearby many-body eigenstates have very different local properties. This is what enables individual MBL eigenstates to display order even if thermodynamic averages are forbidden from doing so.

== Localization-protected symmetry-breaking order ==
Localization enables symmetry breaking orders at finite energy densities, forbidden in equilibrium by the Peierls-Mermin-Wagner Theorems.

Let us illustrate this with the concrete example of a disordered transverse field Ising chain in one dimension:

$$H = \sum_{i=1}^L J_i \sigma_i^z \sigma_{i+1}^z + h_i \sigma_i^x + J_{\rm int} ( \sigma_i^z \sigma_{i+2}^z + \sigma_i^z \sigma_{i+1}^z)$$

where $\sigma_i^{x/y/z}$ are Pauli spin-1/2 operators in a chain of length $L$, all the couplings $\{J_i, h_i\}$ are positive random numbers drawn from distributions with means $\overline{J}, \overline{h}$, and the system has Ising symmetry $P = \prod_i \sigma_i^x$ corresponding to flipping all spins in the $z$ basis. The $J_{\rm int}$ term introduces interactions, and the system is mappable to a free fermion model (the Kitaev chain) when $J_{\rm int}=0$.

=== Non-interacting Ising chain – no disorder ===
Fig 1. Phases of an Ising chain (a) without interactions or disorder, (b) with disorder but no interactions and (c) with disorder and interactions.

Let us first consider the clean, non-interacting system: $J_i = J, \;h_i = h, \; J_{\rm int}=0$. In equilibrium, the ground state is ferromagnetically ordered with spins aligned along the $z$ axis for $J>h$, but is a paramagnet for $J < h$ and at any finite temperature (Fig 1a). Deep in the ordered phase, the system has two degenerate Ising symmetric ground states which look like "Schrödinger cat" or superposition states: $|\psi_0^\pm\rangle = \frac{1}{\sqrt{2}}(|\uparrow\uparrow \cdots \uparrow\rangle \pm |\downarrow\downarrow \cdots \downarrow\rangle)$. These display long-range order:

$$\lim_{|i-j| \rightarrow \infty} \lim_{L \rightarrow \infty} \langle \psi_0^\pm| \sigma_i^z \sigma_j^z|\psi_0^\pm\rangle - \langle \psi_0^\pm| \sigma_i^z|\psi_0^\pm\rangle\langle \psi_0^\pm| \sigma_j^z|\psi_0^\pm\rangle  > 0.$$

At any finite temperature, thermal fluctuations lead to a finite density of delocalized domain walls since the entropic gain from creating these domain walls wins over the energy cost in one dimension. These fluctuations destroy long-range order since the presence of fluctuating domain walls destroys the correlation between distant spins.

=== Disordered non-interacting Ising chain ===
Upon turning on disorder, the excitations in the non-interacting model ($J_{\rm int}=0$) localize due to Anderson localization. In other words, the domain walls get pinned by the disorder, so that a generic highly excited eigenstate for $\overline{J} \gg \overline{h}$ looks like $|\psi_{\rm SG}^{n,\pm}\rangle = \frac{1}{\sqrt{2}}(|\uparrow\uparrow \downarrow \downarrow \downarrow \uparrow \uparrow \cdots \rangle \pm |\downarrow\downarrow \uparrow \uparrow \uparrow \downarrow \downarrow \cdots \rangle$, where $n$ refers to the $n^\text{th}$ eigenstate and the pattern is eigenstate dependent. Note that a spin-spin correlation function evaluated in this state is non-zero for arbitrarily distant spins, but has fluctuating sign depending on whether an even/odd number of domain walls are crossed between two sites. Whence, we say that the system has long-range spin-glass (SG) order. Indeed, for $\overline{J} > \overline{h}$, localization promotes the ground state ferromagnetic order to spin-glass order in highly excited states at all energy densities (Fig 1b). If one averages over eigenstates as in the thermal Gibbs state, the fluctuating signs causes the correlation to average out as required by Peierls theorem forbidding symmetry breaking of discrete symmetries at finite temperatures in 1D. For $\overline{J} < \overline{h}$, the system is paramagnetic (PM), and the eigenstates deep in the PM look like product states in the $x$ basis and do not show long range Ising order: $|\psi_{\rm PM}^n\rangle = |\rightarrow \rightarrow \leftarrow \leftarrow\leftarrow \rightarrow \cdots \rangle$. The transition between the localized PM and the localized SG at $\overline{J} = \overline{h}$ belongs to the infinite randomness universality class.

=== Disordered interacting Ising chain ===
Upon turning on weak interactions $J_{\rm int} \neq 0$, the Anderson insulator remains many-body localized and order persists deep in the PM/SG phases. Strong enough interactions destroy MBL and the system transitions to a thermalizing phase. The fate of the MBL PM to MBL SG transition in the presence of interactions is presently unsettled, and it is likely this transition proceeds via an intervening thermal phase (Fig 1c).

== Detecting eigenstate order – measurable signatures ==
While the discussion above pertains to sharp diagnostics of LPQO obtained by evaluating order parameters and correlation functions in individual highly excited many-body eigenstates, such quantities are nearly impossible to measure experimentally. Nevertheless, even though individual eigenstates aren't themselves experimentally accessible, order in eigenstates has measurable dynamical signatures. In other words, measuring a local physically accessible observable in time starting from a physically preparable initial state still contains sharp signatures of eigenstate order.

For example, for the disordered Ising chain discussed above, one can prepare random symmetry-broken initial states which are product states in the $z$basis: $|\psi_0\rangle = |\uparrow \downarrow \downarrow \uparrow \cdots \uparrow \uparrow \downarrow\rangle$. These randomly chosen states are at infinite temperature. Then, one can measures the local magnetization $\langle \sigma_i^z \rangle$in time, which acts as an order parameter for symmetry breaking. It is straightforward to show that $\langle \psi_0(t)| \sigma_i^z |\psi_0(t)\rangle$saturates to a non-zero value even for infinitely late times in the symmetry-broken spin-glass phase, while it decays to zero in the paramagnet. The singularity in the eigenspectrum properties at the transition between the localized SG and PM phases translates into a sharp dynamical phase transition which is measurable. Indeed, a nice example of this is furnished by recent experiments detecting time-crystals in Floquet MBL systems, where the time crystal phase spontaneously breaks both time translation symmetry and spatial Ising symmetry, showing correlated spatiotemporal eigenstate order.

== Localization-protected topological order ==
Similar to the case of symmetry breaking order, thermal fluctuations at finite temperatures can reduce or destroy the quantum correlations necessary for topological order. Once again, localization can enable such orders in regimes forbidden by equilibrium. This happens for both the so-called long range entangled topological phases, and for symmetry protected or short-range entangled topological phases. The toric-code/$Z_2$ gauge theory in 2D is an example of the former, and the topological order in this phase can be diagnosed by Wilson loop operators. The topological order is destroyed in equilibrium at any finite temperature due to fluctuating vortices--- however, these can get localized by disorder, enabling glassy localization-protected topological order at finite energy densities. On the other hand, symmetry protected topological (SPT) phases do have any bulk long-range order, and are distinguished from trivial paramagnets due to the presence of coherent gapless edge modes as long the protecting symmetry is present. In equilibrium, these edge modes are typically destroyed at finite temperatures as they decohere due to interactions with delocalized bulk excitations. Once again, localization protects the coherence of these modes even at finite energy densities! The presence of localization-protected topological order could potentially have far-reaching consequences for developing new quantum technologies by allowing for quantum coherent phenomena at high energies.

== Floquet systems ==
It has been shown that periodically driven or Floquet systems can also be many-body localized under suitable drive conditions. This is remarkable because one generically expects a driven many-body system to simply heat up to a trivial infinite temperature state (the maximum entropy state without energy conservation). However, with MBL, this heating can be evaded and one can again get non-trivial quantum orders in the eigenstates of the Floquet unitary, which is the time-evolution operator for one period. The most striking example of this is the time-crystal, a phase with long-range spatiotemporal order and spontaneous breaking of time translation symmetry. This phase is disallowed in thermal equilibrium, but can be realized in a Floquet MBL setting.
