= Tormod Lunde =

Norwegian-American sociologist

Tormod K. Lunde
- Born: 29 November 1954 (age 71)
- Scientific career
- Fields: Sociology
- Institutions: Columbia University; National Institute for Consumer Research; University of Oslo; BI Norwegian Business School
- Doctoral advisor: Morris Zelditch

Tormod Karsten Lunde (born 29 November 1954), also known as Tormod K. Lunde, is a Norwegian-American sociologist.

He was Director of the National Institute for Consumer Research from 1990 to 1997. He was also Professor of Sociology at the University of Oslo from 1991 to 1998 and at BI Norwegian Business School from 1997 to 2002.

He is an expert on organizational theory, consumer behaviour, money, debt and living conditions, entrepreneurship, and quantitative methods. He was also one of the early social researchers to take an interest in the Internet and electronic commerce. He has also been involved in research on modernization and political instability, employing quantitative methods to the study of African coups d'état. He now lives in California.

Lunde holds a PhD in sociology from Stanford University (1987); his dissertation was titled The state in a cross-national perspective: growth, inertia, and internal competition, and his doctoral advisor was Morris Zelditch, himself a doctoral student of Talcott Parsons. Lunde was Assistant Professor of Sociology at Columbia University from 1985 to 1989. He then joined the National Institute for Consumer Research, where he shortly after became research director. He became acting director in 1990 and was appointed by the Norwegian government as the director in 1992.

He was a member of the Government Commission on Consumer Affairs, which presented Norwegian Official Report (NOU) 1995:21 "Organisering av forbrukerapparatet."
