= Morris Zelditch =

American sociologist (1928–2017)

- Born: February 29, 1928; Pittsburgh, Pennsylvania
- Died: December 8, 2017 (aged 89); Stanford, California
- Education: Harvard University
- Children: Steven Zelditch, Miriam Leah Zelditch
- Scientific career
- Fields: Sociology
- Workplaces: Columbia University; Stanford University
- Doctoral advisor: Talcott Parsons
- Doctoral students: Tormod Lunde

Morris "Buzz" Zelditch (February 29, 1928 – December 8, 2017) was an American sociologist. He was emeritus Professor of Sociology at Stanford University, where he had been a member of the faculty since 1961. He was known for his work on the effects of status characteristics embedded in the stratification of the larger society, legitimacy of structures of authority, and generalizability of the results of sociological experiments.

He received his B.A. from Oberlin College in 1951 and his PhD from Harvard University in 1955; his doctoral advisor was Talcott Parsons and his dissertation was titled Authority and Solidarity in Three Southwestern Communities. He then taught at the sociology department of Columbia University 1955–61, before joining Stanford University in 1961 as an associate professor of Sociology and eventually as a full Professor. He was also chairman of Stanford's sociology department during the years 1964–1968 and 1989–1994. He officially retired in 1996, but continued to teach and to publish; "his current research on legitimacy is concerned with the legitimacy of groups: With its determinants; with its effects on the mobilization of resources, for example its effects on tax compliance, on the one hand, and moral hazards (such as corruption) on the other; with the consequences of these effects for the provision of public goods; and, finally, with effects of the legitimacy of multiple levels of groups on inter-group relations".

He was editor-in-chief of the American Sociological Review 1975–1978, President of the Pacific Sociological Association 1991–1992 and chairman of the theory section of the American Sociological Association in 1999–2000. He received the Cooley-Mead Award for Distinguished Scholarship from the ASA's Section on Social Psychology in 2000 and the Dean’s Award for Distinguished Lifetime Achievement in Teaching from Stanford University in 2007. He died on December 8, 2017, at the age of 89.

His son, Steven Zelditch, was a professor of mathematics at Northwestern University.
