= Steven Zelditch =

American mathematician (1953–2022)

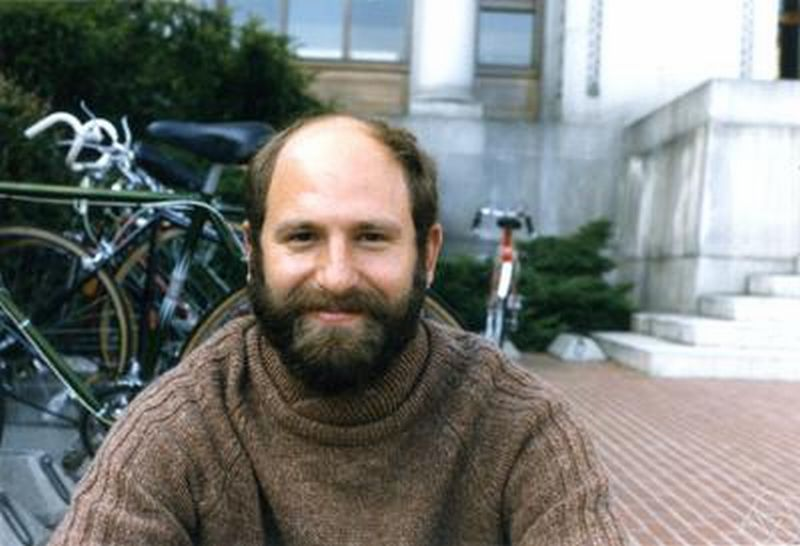
- Zelditch in Berkeley in 1986
- Born: 13 September 1953
- Died: 11 September 2022 (aged 68)
- Parent: Morris Zelditch

Academic background
- Doctoral advisor: Alan Weinstein

Steven Morris Zelditch (13 September 1953 – 11 September 2022) was an American mathematician, specializing in global analysis, complex geometry, and mathematical physics (e.g., quantum chaos).

Zelditch received in 1975 from Harvard University his bachelor's degree in mathematics and in 1981 from the University of California, Berkeley his Ph.D. under Alan Weinstein with thesis Reconstruction of singularities of solutions for Schrödinger's equations. From 1981 to 1985 Zelditch was Ritt Assistant Professor at Columbia University. At Johns Hopkins University he was from 1985 to 1989 an assistant Professor, from 1989 to 1992 an associate professor, and from 1992 to 2010 a professor. In 2010 he moved to Northwestern University, where he was Wayne and Elizabeth Jones Professor of Mathematics.

In 1987/88 he was at MIT and in 1988 a visiting professor at MSRI.

He has done research on the spectral and scattering theory of the Laplace operator on Riemannian manifolds and especially the asymptotic and distribution of its eigenfunctions (e.g. quantum ergodicity, equidistribution of eigenfunctions in billiard geometries, quantum ergodic restriction theorems to separating hypersurfaces). He has also done research on the inverse spectral problem. (This problem is described in Can you hear the shape of a drum? by Mark Kac.) In a seminal paper in 2009, Zelditch showed that one can recover the shape of a convex, analytic planar domain with up-down symmetries from its Laplace spectrum. In 2019, with his coauthor, Zelditch showed that ellipses of small eccentricity are spectrally determined amongst all smooth, convex planar domains. Among Zelditch's other research topics are Bergman kernels, Kähler metrics, Gaussian analytic functions, and random metrics. In a famous paper, Zelditch applied semiclassical methods to complex algebraic geometry with the semiclassical parameter playing the role of the reciprocal power of an ample line bundle over a Kähler manifold. The Tian-Yau-Zelditch theorem in this case gives a complete asymptotic expansion of the Bergman kernel near the diagonal. For example, the Catlin-De Angelo-Quillen theorem easily follows from this.

In 2002 he was an invited speaker with talk Asymptotics of polynomials and eigenfunctions at the International Congress of Mathematicians in Beijing. He was elected a Fellow of the American Mathematical Society in 2012.

In 2013, he and Xiaojun Huang shared the Stefan Bergman Prize for research done independently; Zelditch was cited for his research on the Bergman kernel.

Prior to his death, he was on the editorial boards of Communications in Mathematical Physics, Analysis & PDE, and the Journal of Geometric Analysis. The Notices of the American Mathematical Society published a memorial tribute to Zelditch in its November 2023 issue. Colleagues Nalini Anantharaman, Michael R. Douglas, Boris Hanin, Andrew Hassell, Hamid Hezari, Semyon Klevtsov, William P. Minicozzi, Duong H. Phong, Yanir A. Rubinstein, Bernard Shiffman, Chris Sogge, Joel Spruck, Alexander Strohmaier, Jacob Sturm, John A. Toth, Ben Weinkove, Alan Weinstein, Richard A. Wentworth, Shing-Tung Yau, and Maciej Zworski contributed tributes.

His father, Morris Zelditch, was a professor of sociology at Stanford.

== Selected publications ==
=== Articles ===
- Zelditch, Steven (1983). "Reconstruction of singularities for solutions of Schrödinger's equation". Communications in Mathematical Physics. 90 (1): 1–26. Bibcode:1983CMaPh..90....1Z. doi:10.1007/BF01209385.
- Zelditch, Steven (1987). "Uniform distribution of eigenfunctions on compact hyperbolic surfaces". Duke Mathematical Journal. 55 (4): 919–941. doi:10.1215/S0012-7094-87-05546-3.
- Zelditch, Steven; Zworski, Maciej (1996). "Ergodicity of eigenfunctions for ergodic billiards". Comm. Math. Phys. 175 (3): 673–682. Bibcode:1996CMaPh.175..673Z. doi:10.1007/BF02099513.
- Zelditch, Steven (1996). "Quantum Ergodicity of C* Dynamical Systems". Comm. Math. Phys. 177 (2): 507–528. arXiv:math-ph/0002008. doi:10.1007/BF02101904.
- Zelditch, Steve (1998). "Szegö kernels and a theorem of Tian". International Mathematics Research Notices. 1998 (6): 317–331. doi:10.1155/S107379289800021X.
- Shiffman, Bernard; Zelditch, Steve (1999). "Distribution of Zeros of Random and Quantum Chaotic Sections of Positive Line Bundles". Communications in Mathematical Physics. 200 (3): 661–683. arXiv:math/9803052. Bibcode:1999CMaPh.200..661S. doi:10.1007/s002200050544.
- Bleher, Pavel; Shiffman, B.; Zelditch, Steve (2000). "Universality and scaling of correlations between zeros on complex manifolds". Inventiones Mathematicae. 142 (2): 351–395. arXiv:math-ph/9904020. Bibcode:2000InMat.142..351B. doi:10.1007/s002220000092.
- Zelditch, Steve (2000). "From random polynomials to symplectic geometry". arXiv:math-ph/0010012.
- Zelditch, Steve (2004). "Survey of the inverse spectral problem". Surveys in Differential Geometry. 9: 401–467. arXiv:math/0402356. doi:10.4310/SDG.2004.v9.n1.a12.
- Zelditch, Steve (2007). "Complex zeros of real ergodic eigenfunctions". Invent. Math. 167 (2): 419–443. arXiv:math/0505513. doi:10.1007/s00222-006-0024-z.
- Zelditch, Steve (2008). "Local and Global Analysis of Natural Functions". In Ji, Lizhen; Li, Peter; Schoen, Richard; Simon, Leon (eds.). Handbook of Geometric Analysis. Vol. 1. arXiv:0903.3420. ISBN 978-1-57146-130-8.
- Zelditch, Steve (2009). "Recent developments in mathematical quantum chaos". Current Developments in Mathematics: 115–202. arXiv:0911.4312. doi:10.4310/CDM.2009.v2009.n1.a4.
- Ferrari, Frank; Klevtsov, Semyon; Zelditch, Steve (2011). "Random Geometry, Quantum Gravity and the Kähler Potential". Phys. Lett. 705 (4): 375–378. arXiv:1107.4022. Bibcode:2011PhLB..705..375F. doi:10.1016/j.physletb.2011.09.098.
- Zelditch, Steve (2013). "IAS / Park City Lectures on Eigenfunctions". arXiv:1310.7888 [math.AP].
- Zelditch, S. (2013). "Eigenfunctions and nodal sets". Surveys in Differential Geometry. 18: 237–308. arXiv:1205.2812. doi:10.4310/SDG.2013.v18.n1.a7.

=== Books ===
- Zelditch, Steven (March 1992). Selberg trace formulae and equidistribution theorems for closed geodesics and Laplace eigenfunctions: finite area surfaces. Memoirs of the American Mathematical Society. Vol. 465. American Mathematical Society. ISBN 0-8218-2526-7. ISSN 0065-9266.
- Zelditch, Steven (2017). Eigenfunctions of the Laplacian on a Riemannian manifold. American Mathematical Society. ISBN 9781470410377. LCCN 2017044799.
