= Quantum scar =

Phenomenon in quantum systems

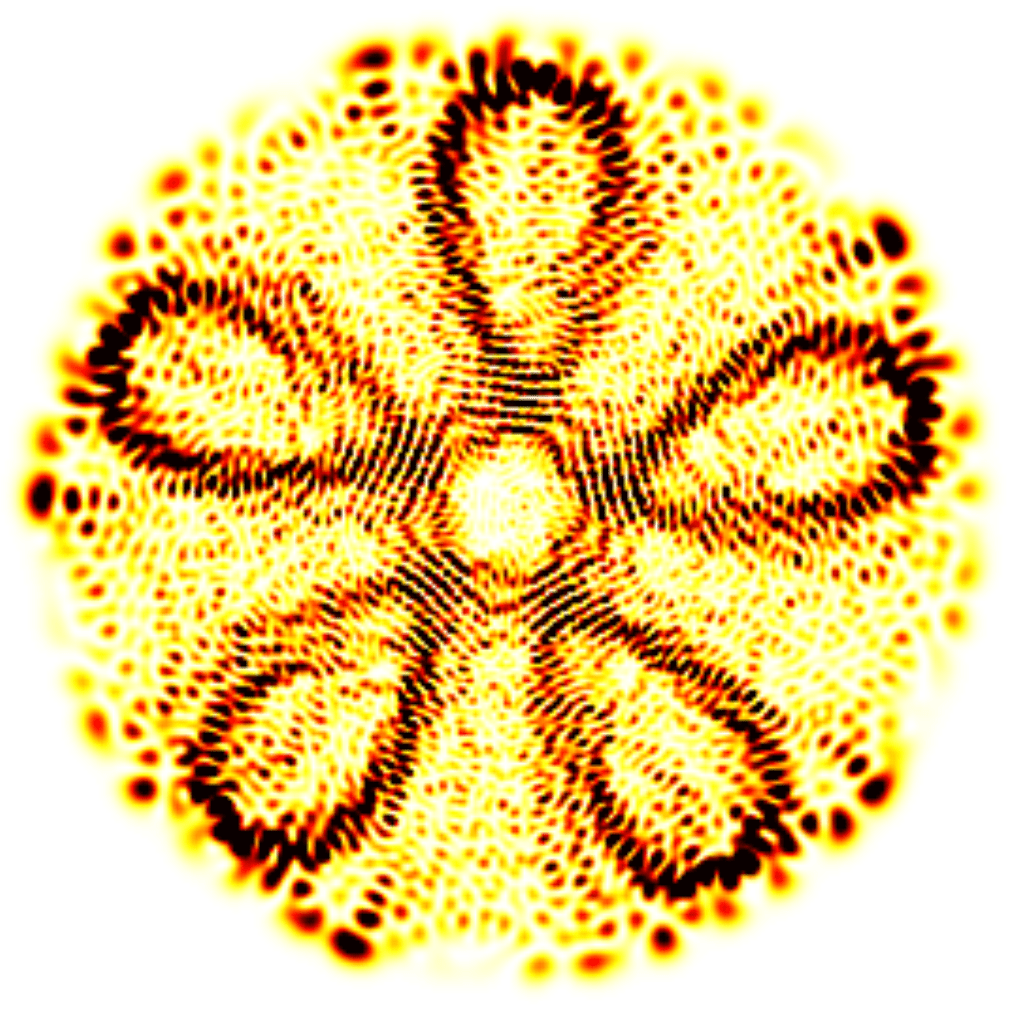
Perturbation-induced quantum skipping scar in a disordered quantum well with an external magnetic field.

In quantum mechanics, quantum scarring is a phenomenon where the eigenstates of a classically chaotic quantum system have enhanced probability density around the paths of unstable classical periodic orbits. The instability of the periodic orbit is a decisive point that differentiates quantum scars from the more trivial observation that the probability density is enhanced in the neighborhood of stable periodic orbits. The latter can be understood as a purely classical phenomenon, a manifestation of the Bohr correspondence principle, whereas in the former, quantum interference is essential. As such, scarring is both a visual example of quantum-classical correspondence, and simultaneously an example of a (local) quantum suppression of chaos.

A classically chaotic system is also ergodic, and therefore (almost) all of its trajectories eventually explore evenly the entire accessible phase space. Thus, it would be natural to expect that the eigenstates of the quantum counterpart would fill the quantum phase space in the uniform manner up to random fluctuations in the semiclassical limit. However, scars are a significant correction to this assumption. Scars can therefore be considered as an eigenstate counterpart of how short periodic orbits provide corrections to the universal spectral statistics of the random matrix theory. There are rigorous mathematical theorems on quantum nature of ergodicity, proving that the expectation value of an operator converges in the semiclassical limit to the corresponding microcanonical classical average. Nonetheless, the quantum ergodicity theorems do not exclude scarring if the quantum phase space volume of the scars gradually vanishes in the semiclassical limit.

On the classical side, there is no direct analogue of scars. On the quantum side, they can be interpreted as an eigenstate analogy to how short periodic orbits correct the universal random matrix theory eigenvalue statistics. Scars correspond to nonergodic states which are permitted by the quantum ergodicity theorems. In particular, scarred states provide a striking visual counterexample to the assumption that the eigenstates of a classically chaotic system would be without structure. In addition to conventional quantum scars, the field of quantum scarring has undergone its renaissance period, sparked by the discoveries of perturbation-induced scars and many-body scars that have subsequently paved the way towards emerging concepts within the field, such as antiscarring and quantum birthmarks.

== Scar theory ==
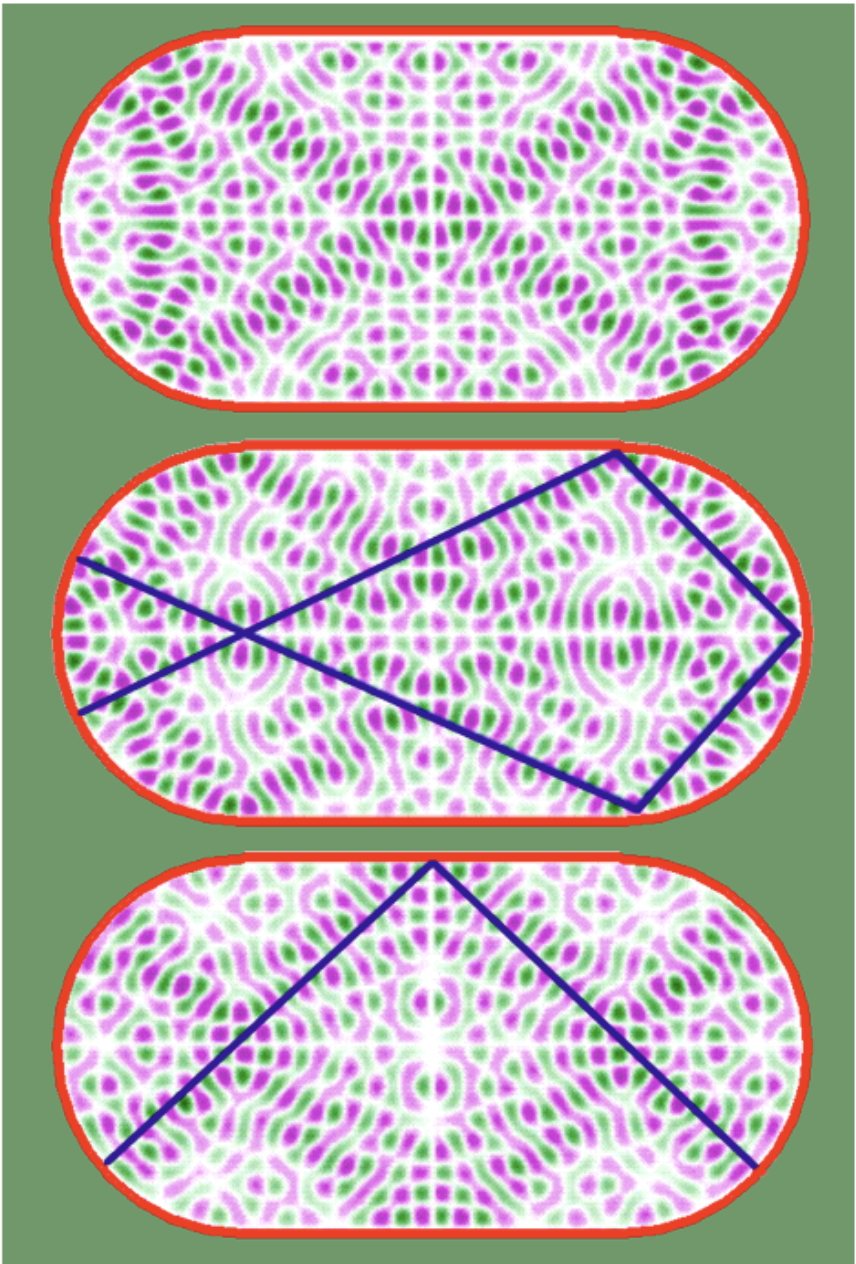
Typical scarred eigenstates of the (Bunimovich) stadium. The figure shows the probability density for three different eigenstates. The scars, referring the regions of concentrated probability density, are generated by (unstable) periodic orbits, two of which are illustrated.

The existence of scarred states is rather unexpected based on the Gutzwiller trace formula, which connects the quantum mechanical density of states to the periodic orbits in the corresponding classical system. According to the trace formula, a quantum spectrum is not a result of a trace over all the positions, but it is determined by a trace over all the periodic orbits only. Furthermore, every periodic orbit contributes to an eigenvalue, although not exactly equally. It is even more unlikely that a particular periodic orbit would stand out in contributing to a particular eigenstate in a fully chaotic system, since altogether periodic orbits occupy a zero-volume portion of the total phase space volume. Hence, nothing seems to imply that any particular periodic orbit for a given eigenvalue could have a significant role compared to other periodic orbits. Nonetheless, quantum scarring proves this assumption to be wrong. The scarring was first seen in 1983 by S. W. McDonald in his thesis on the stadium billiard as an interesting numerical observation. They did not show up well in his figure because they were fairly crude "waterfall" plots. This finding was not thoroughly reported in the article discussion about the wave functions and nearest-neighbor level spacing spectra for the stadium billiard. A year later, Eric J. Heller published the first examples of scarred eigenfunctions together with a theoretical explanation for their existence. The results revealed large footprints of individual periodic orbits influencing some eigenstates of the classically chaotic Bunimovich stadium, named as scars by Heller.

A wave packet analysis was a key in proving the existence of the scars, and it is still a valuable tool to understand them. In the original work of Heller, the quantum spectrum is extracted by propagating a Gaussian wave packet along a periodic orbit. Nowadays, this seminal idea is known as the linear theory of scarring. Scars stand out to the eye in some eigenstates of classically chaotic systems, but are quantified by projection of the eigenstates onto certain test states, often Gaussians, having both average position and average momentum along the periodic orbit. These test states give a provably structured spectrum that reveals the necessity of scars. However, there is no universal measure on scarring; the exact relationship of the stability exponent $\chi$ to the scarring strength is a matter of definition. Nonetheless, there is a rule of thumb: quantum scarring is significant when $\chi < 2\pi$, and the strength scales as $\chi^{-1}$. Thus, strong quantum scars are, in general, associated with periodic orbits that are moderately unstable and relatively short. The theory predicts the scar enhancement along a classical periodic orbit, but it cannot precisely pinpoint which particular states are scarred and how much. Rather, it can be only stated that some states are scarred within certain energy zones, and by at least by a certain degree.

The linear scarring theory outlined above has been later extended to include nonlinear effects taking place after the wave packet departs the linear dynamics domain around the periodic orbit. At long times, the nonlinear effect can assist the scarring. This stems from nonlinear recurrences associated with homoclinic orbits. A further insight on scarring was acquired with a real-space approach by E. B. Bogomolny and a phase-space alternative by Michael V. Berry complementing the wave-packet and Hussimi space methods utilized by Heller and L. Kaplan.

As well as there being no universal measure for the level of scarring, there is also no generally accepted definition of it. Originally, it was stated that certain unstable periodic orbits are shown to permanently scar some quantum eigenfunctions as $\hbar \rightarrow 0$, in the sense that extra density surrounds the region of the periodic orbit. However, a more formal definition for scarring would be the following: A quantum eigenstate of a classically chaotic system is scarred by a periodic if its density on the classical invariant manifolds near and all along that periodic is systematically enhanced above the classical, statistically expected density along that orbit.

Most of the research on quantum scars has been restricted to non-relativistic quantum systems described by the Schrödinger equation, where the dependence of the particle energy on momentum is quadratic. However, scarring can occur in a relativistic quantum systems described by the Dirac equation, where the energy-momentum relation is linear instead. Heuristically, these relativistic scars are a consequence of the fact that both spinor components satisfy the Helmholtz equation, in analogue to the time-independent Schrödinger equation. Therefore, relativistic scars have the same origin as the conventional scarring introduced by E. J. Heller. Nevertheless, there is a difference in terms of the recurrence with respect to energy variation. Furthermore, it was shown that the scarred states can lead to strong conductance fluctuations in the corresponding open quantum dots via the mechanism of resonant transmission.

The first experimental confirmations of scars were obtained in microwave billiards in the early 1990s. Further experimental evidence for scarring has later been delivered by observations in, e.g., quantum wells, optical cavities and the hydrogen atom. In the early 2000s, the first observations were achieved in an elliptical billiard. Many classical trajectories converge in this system and lead to pronounced scarring at the foci, commonly called as quantum mirages. In addition, recent numerical results indicated the existence of quantum scars in ultracold atomic gases. Aside from these analog scars in classical wave experiments, the verification of this phenomenon had remained elusive in true quantum systems — until the recent achievement of using scanning tunneling microscopy to directly visualize (relativistic) quantum scars in a stadium-shaped, graphene-based quantum dot.

In addition to scarring described above, there are several similar phenomena, either connected by theory or appearance. First of all, when scars are visually identified, some of the states may remind of classical ''bouncing-ball'' motion, excluded from quantum scars into its own category. For example, a stadium billiard supports these highly nonergodic eigenstates, which reflect trapped bouncing motion between the straight walls. It has been shown that the bouncing states persist at the limit $\hbar \rightarrow 0$, but at the same time this result suggests a diminishing percentage of all the states in the agreement with the quantum ergodicity theorems of Alexander Schnirelman, Yves Colin de Verdière, and Steven Zelditch. Secondly, scarring should not be confused with statistical fluctuations. Similar structures of an enhanced probability density occur even as random superpositions of plane waves, in the sense of the Berry conjecture. Furthermore, there is a genre of scars, not caused by actual periodic orbits, but their remnants, known as ghosts. They refer to periodic orbits that are found in a nearby system in the sense of some tunable, external system parameter. Scarring of this kind has been associated to almost-periodic orbits. Another subclass of ghosts stems from complex periodic orbits which exist in the vicinity of bifurcation points.

== Perturbation-induced (variational) quantum scars ==
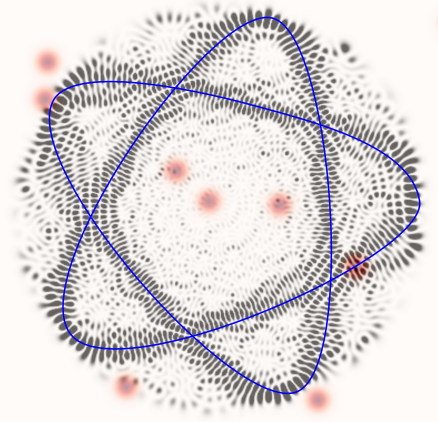
Example of scarring in disordered quantum dots. The unperturbed potential has the shape of $V(r) \propto r^5$ , and it is perturbed with randomly scattered Gaussian bumps (red markers denote the locations and size of the bumps). The figure shows one of the eigenstates of the perturbed quantum well that is strongly scarred by a periodic orbit of the unperturbed system (solid blue line).

A new class of quantum scars was discovered in disordered two-dimensional nanostructures. Although similar in appearance to ordinary quantum scars described earlier, these scars have a fundamentally different origin. In this case, the disorder arising from small perturbations (see red dots in the figure) is sufficient to destroy classical long-time stability. Hence, there is no moderately unstable periodic orbit in the classical counterpart to which a scar would correspond in the ordinary scar theory. Instead, scars are formed around periodic orbits of the corresponding unperturbed system. Ordinary scar theory is further excluded by the behavior of the scars as a function of the disorder strength. When the potential bumps are made stronger while keeping them otherwise unchanged, the scars grow stronger and then fade away without changing their orientation. On the contrary, a scar caused by conventional theory should become rapidly weaker due to the increase of the stability exponent of a periodic orbit with increasing disorder. Furthermore, comparing scars at different energies reveals that they occur in only a few distinct orientations, which also contradicts predictions of ordinary scar theory.

== Many-body quantum scarring ==
The area of quantum many-body scars is a subject of active research.

Scars have occurred in investigations for potential applications of Rydberg states to quantum computing, specifically acting as qubits for quantum simulation. The particles of the system in an alternating ground state-Rydberg state configuration continually entangled and disentangled rather than remaining entangled and undergoing thermalization. Systems of the same atoms prepared with other initial states did thermalize as expected. The researchers dubbed the phenomenon "quantum many-body scarring".

The causes of quantum scarring are not well understood. One possible proposed explanation is that quantum scars represent integrable systems, or nearly do so, and this could prevent thermalization from ever occurring. This has drawn criticisms arguing that a non-integrable Hamiltonian underlies the theory. Recently, a series of works has related the existence of quantum scarring to an algebraic structure known as dynamical symmetries.

Fault-tolerant quantum computers are desired, as any perturbations to qubit states can cause the states to thermalize, leading to loss of quantum information. Scarring of qubit states is seen as a potential way to protect qubit states from outside disturbances leading to decoherence and information loss.

== Antiscarring ==
A fascinating consequence of quantum scarring is its dual partner—antiscarring, which refers to a systematic depression of the probability density in quantum states along the path of the scar-generating periodic orbit. The existence of antiscarring is confirmed by a general stacking theorem: the cumulative probability density of the eigenstates becomes uniform when the energy window of the summed eigenstates is larger than the energy scale associated with the shortest periodic orbit in the system. Since there may be strongly scarred states among the eigenstates, the necessity for a uniform average over a large number of states requires the existence of antiscarred states with low probability in the region of ''regular'' scars. This effect has been demonstrated in the context of variational scarring, where it is promoted by the strength and similar orientation of the scars within a moderate energy window. Furthermore, it has been realized that some decay processes have antiscarred states with anomalously long escape times.

== Quantum birthmarks ==
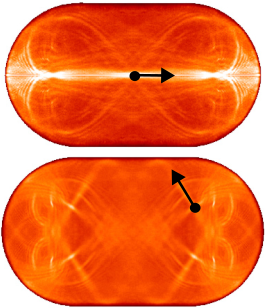
Figure presents two cases of the time-averaged probability density of a quantum wavepacket in the long-time limit, either launched on top of a scar (upper) or into a generic direction (lower). In both cases, the long-term distribution contains an imprint of the initial behavior, a quantum birthmark, instead of the expected uniformity associated with the classical ergodicity.

A hallmark of classical ergodicity is the complete loss of memory of initial conditions, resulting from the eventual uniform exploration of phase space. In a quantum system, however, classical ergodic behavior can break down, as exemplified by the presence of quantum scars. The concept of a quantum birthmark bridges the short-term effects, such as due to scarring, and the long-term predictions of random matrix theory. By extending beyond quantum scarring, quantum birthmarks offer a new paradigm for understanding the elusive quantum nature of ergodicity.

Figure depicts two birthmarks unveiled within the time-averaged probability density of a wavepacket launched under different initial conditions (indicated by the black arrows) in the stadium. The upper plot shows the result for a wavepacket released vertically from the center along a bouncing-ball orbit; whereas the lower plot depicts an wapacket prepared off-center at an arbitrary angle, corresponding to a generic initial state. Notably, quantum birthmarks in each case respect the two reflection symmetries of the stadium. These two cases clearly demonstrate that a quantum system can violate the classical ergodicity assumption in the sense that the probability density becomes uniform even at infinite time. Therefore, quantum scars presents a new form of weak ergodicity breaking, beyond quantum scarring taking place at the eigenstate level. While any initial state and its short-term behavior will be memorized by a quantum system, the strength of the corresponding birthmark depends on the dynamical details of the birthplace, particularly this quantum memory effect is boosted in the presence of scarring.

== See also ==
- Quantum chaos
