= Thermal oscillator =

A thermal oscillator is a system where conduction along thermal gradients overshoots thermal equilibrium, resulting in thermal oscillations where parts of the system oscillate between being colder and hotter than average.
