= Thermal center =

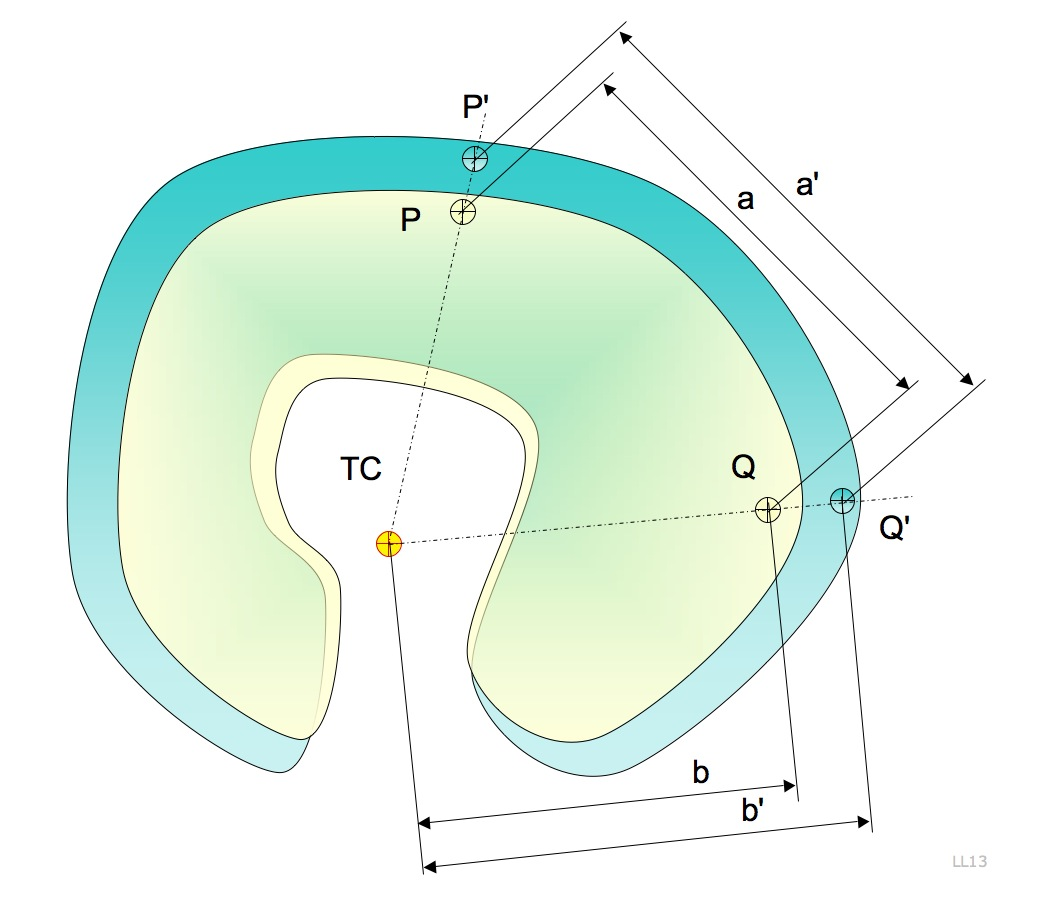
Picture of the thermal center.

The thermal center is a concept used in applied mechanics and engineering. When a solid body is exposed to a thermal variation, an expansion will occur, changing the dimensions and potentially the shape of the body and the position of its points. Under certain circumstances it may happen that one point belonging to the space associated to the body has no displacement at all: this point is called the thermal center (TC).

== Applications ==
The thermal center position is not affected by a thermal expansion: this property makes the TC a very interesting point in those applications where it is important that thermal variations have no effects on a certain process. Photolitography machines and high precision optical instruments are some examples of application of this concept.

== Definition ==
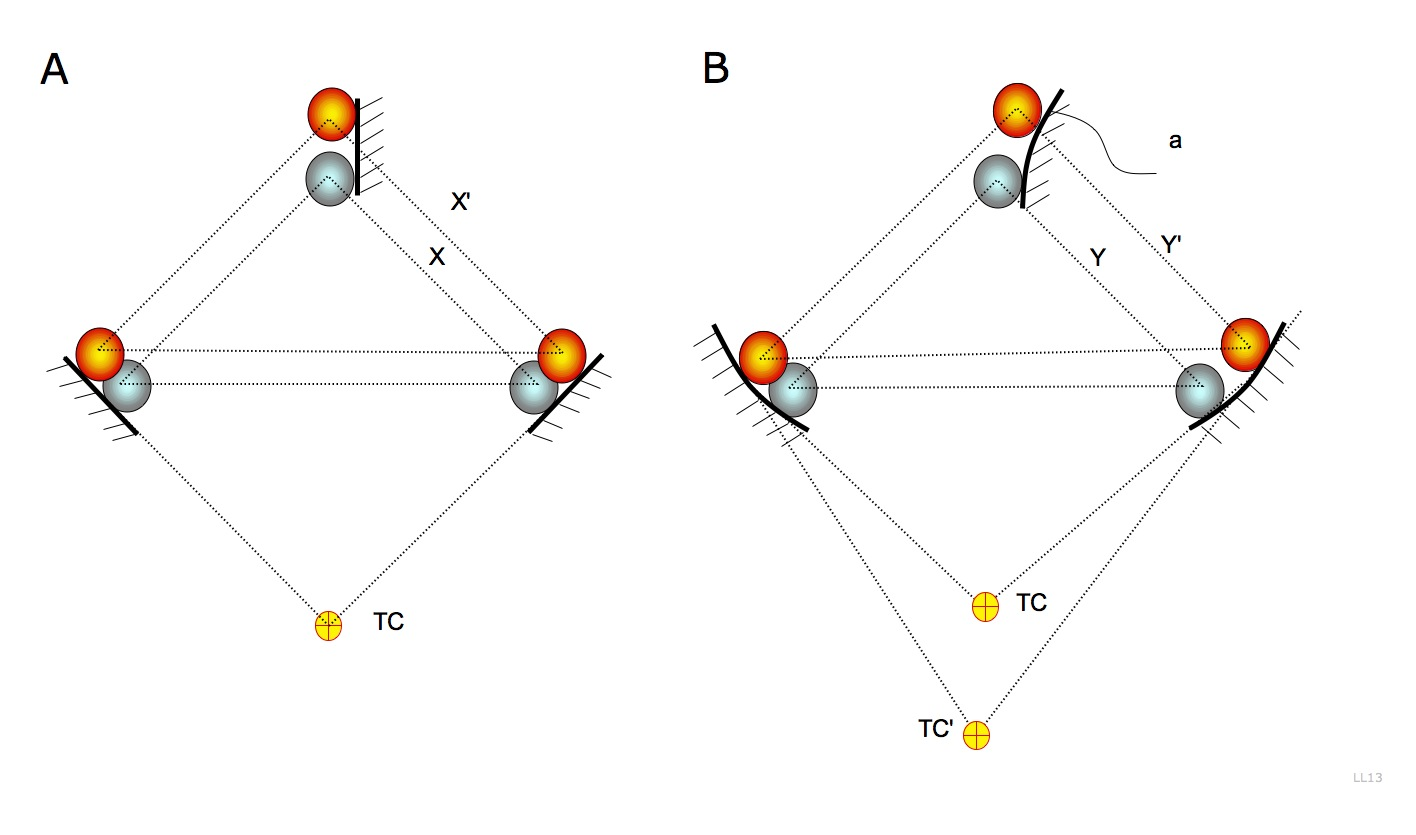
Picture A: geometric construction of the thermal center: under the mentioned hypothesis, thermal center position is only function of the constraints. Picture B: This is an example of thermal center not defined, since the geometrical construction leads to different points for different expansions.

The thermal center is defined under the following hypothesis:

- A solid body with homogeneous and isotropic thermal properties;
- Isostatically constrained;
- A thermal variation ΔT is applied to the entire body.

The thermal variation will produce an expansion of the body: this means that for each couple of points P and Q the distance will become:

$d_2(P,Q) = K \cdot d_1(P,Q)$

where $K = 1 + \alpha \cdot \Delta T$, $\alpha$ is the coefficient of thermal expansion. Analyzing this phenomenon in an absolute coordinate system, the transformation of the solid body is a geometrical similarity. It is possible that, choosing the constrains conveniently, one point belonging to the space associated to the body will not move during the thermal variation: this point is called thermal center. In this case, the geometrical similarity becomes a homothety and the thermal center is the center of the homothety itself.

The thermal center does not always exist. The TC is a function of the constraints. Picture B shows an example where the geometry of the constraints doesn't come to a unique point.

The TC may exist even if the body has non-homogeneous isotropic thermal properties, but when this condition is not verified, it's not possible to determine its position by using the simple geometric method shown above, and the transformation will not be a homothety.

== See also ==
- Thermal expansion
