= Many-body localization =

Phenomenon of isolated many-body quantum systems not reaching thermal equilibrium

Many-body localization (MBL) is a dynamical phenomenon occurring in isolated many-body quantum systems. It is characterized by the system failing to reach thermal equilibrium, and retaining a memory of its initial condition in local observables for infinite times.

== Thermalization and localization ==
Textbook quantum statistical mechanics assumes that systems go to thermal equilibrium (thermalization). The process of thermalization erases local memory of the initial conditions. In textbooks, thermalization is ensured by coupling the system to an external environment or "reservoir," with which the system can exchange energy. What happens if the system is isolated from the environment, and evolves according to its own Schrödinger equation? Does the system still thermalize?

Quantum mechanical time evolution is unitary and formally preserves all information about the initial condition in the quantum state at all times. However, a quantum system generically contains a macroscopic number of degrees of freedom, but can only be probed through few-body measurements which are local in real space. The meaningful question then becomes whether accessible local measurements display thermalization.

This question can be formalized by considering the quantum mechanical density matrix ρ of the system. If the system is divided into a subregion A (the region being probed) and its complement B (everything else), then all information that can be extracted by measurements made on A alone is encoded in the reduced density matrix $\rho_A=\operatorname{Tr}_B\rho(t)$. If, in the long time limit, $\rho_A(t)$ approaches a thermal density matrix at a temperature set by the energy density in the state, then the system has "thermalized," and no local information about the initial condition can be extracted from local measurements. This process of "quantum thermalization" may be understood in terms of B acting as a reservoir for A. In this perspective, the entanglement entropy $S=-\operatorname{Tr}(\rho_A \log \rho_A)$ of a thermalizing system in a pure state plays the role of thermal entropy. Thermalizing systems therefore generically have extensive or "volume law" entanglement entropy at any non-zero temperature. They also generically obey the eigenstate thermalization hypothesis (ETH).

In contrast, if $\rho_A(T)$ fails to approach a thermal density matrix even in the long time limit, and remains instead close to its initial condition $\rho_A(0)$, then the system retains forever a memory of its initial condition in local observables. This latter possibility is referred to as "many body localization," and involves B failing to act as a reservoir for A. A system in a many body localized phase exhibits MBL, and continues to exhibit MBL even when subject to arbitrary local perturbations. Eigenstates of systems exhibiting MBL do not obey the ETH, and generically follow an "area law" for entanglement entropy (i.e. the entanglement entropy scales with the surface area of subregion A). A brief list of properties differentiating thermalizing and MBL systems is provided below.

- In thermalizing systems, a memory of initial conditions is not accessible in local observables at long times. In MBL systems, memory of initial conditions remains accessible in local observables at long times.
- In thermalizing systems, energy eigenstates obey ETH. In MBL systems, energy eigenstates do not obey ETH.
- In thermalizing systems, energy eigenstates have volume law entanglement entropy. In MBL systems, energy eigenstates have area law entanglement entropy.
- Thermalizing systems generically have non-zero thermal conductivity. MBL systems have zero thermal conductivity.
- Thermalizing systems have continuous local spectra. MBL systems have discrete local spectra.
- In thermalizing systems, entanglement entropy grows as a power law in time starting from low entanglement initial conditions. In MBL systems, entanglement entropy grows logarithmically in time starting from low entanglement initial conditions.
- In thermalizing systems, the dynamics of out-of-time-ordered correlators forms a linear light cone which reflects the ballistic propagation of information. In MBL systems, the light cone is logarithmic.

== History ==
MBL was first proposed by P.W. Anderson in 1958 as a possibility that could arise in strongly disordered quantum systems. The basic idea was that if particles all live in a random energy landscape, then any rearrangement of particles would change the energy of the system. Since energy is a conserved quantity in quantum mechanics, such a process can only be virtual and cannot lead to any transport of particle number or energy.

While localization for single particle systems was demonstrated already in Anderson's original paper (coming to be known as Anderson localization), the existence of the phenomenon for many particle systems remained a conjecture for decades. In 1980 Fleishman and Anderson demonstrated the phenomenon survived the addition of interactions to lowest order in perturbation theory. In a 1998 study, the analysis was extended to all orders in perturbation theory, in a zero-dimensional system, and the MBL phenomenon was shown to survive. In 2005 and 2006, this was extended to high orders in perturbation theory in high dimensional systems. MBL was argued to survive at least at low energy density. A series of numerical works provided further evidence for the phenomenon in one dimensional systems, at all energy densities ("infinite temperature"). Finally, in 2014 Imbrie presented a proof of MBL for certain one dimensional spin chains with strong disorder, with the localization being stable to arbitrary local perturbations – i.e. the systems were shown to be in a many body localized phase.

It is now believed that MBL can arise also in periodically driven "Floquet" systems where energy is conserved only modulo the drive frequency.

In 2025, showed that subsystems within many-body localized systems follow stable quasi-periodic dynamics rather than approaching a steady, thermalized state. The work further showed that averaging over many disorder realizations—an approach commonly used in the literature—can mask this behavior and produce the misleading appearance of slow, logarithmic entanglement growth, even though individual subsystems do not thermalize. This result provides a new evidence for the stability of the MBL phase.

== Emergent integrability ==
Many body localized systems exhibit a phenomenon known as emergent integrability. In a non-interacting Anderson insulator, the occupation number of each localized single particle orbital is separately a local integral of motion. It was conjectured (and proven by Imbrie) that a similar extensive set of local integrals of motion should also exist in the MBL phase. Consider for specificity a one dimensional spin-1/2 chain with Hamiltonian

$$H=\sum_i \left [ J \left ( X_i X_{i+1} + Y_i Y_{i+1} \right ) + J^\prime Z_i Z_{i+1} + h_i Z_i  \right ],$$

where X, Y and Z are Pauli operators, and h_{I} are random variables drawn from a distribution of some width W. When the disorder is strong enough (W>W_{c}) that all eigenstates are localized, then there exists a local unitary transformation to new variables τ such that

$$H=\sum_i h^\prime_i \tau^z_i + \sum_{ij} J_{ij} \tau^z_i \tau^z_j + \sum_{ijk} K_{ijk} \tau^z_i \tau^z_j \tau^z_k + \cdots,$$

where τ are Pauli operators that are related to the physical Pauli operators by a local unitary transformation, the ... indicates additional terms which only involve τ^{z} operators, and the coefficients fall off exponentially with distance. This Hamiltonian manifestly contains an extensive number of localized integrals of motion or "l-bits" (the operators τ^{z}_{i}, which all commute with the Hamiltonian). If the original Hamiltonian is perturbed, the l-bits get redefined, but the integrable structure survives.

== Exotic orders ==
MBL enables the formation of exotic forms of quantum order that could not arise in thermal equilibrium, through the phenomenon of localization-protected quantum order. A form of localization-protected quantum order, arising only in periodically driven systems, is the Floquet time crystal.

== Experimental realizations ==
A number of experiments have been reported observing the MBL phenomenon. Most of these experiments involve synthetic quantum systems, such as assemblies of ultracold atoms or trapped ions. Experimental explorations of the phenomenon in solid state systems are still in their infancy.

== See also ==
- Quantum scar
- Thermalization
- Time crystal
