= Nanolaser =

Laser that has nanoscale dimensions

A nanolaser is a laser that has nanoscale dimensions and it refers to a micro-/nano- device which can emit light with light or electric excitation of nanowires or other nanomaterials that serve as resonators. A standard feature of nanolasers includes their light confinement on a scale approaching or suppressing the diffraction limit of light. These tiny lasers can be modulated quickly and, combined with their small footprint, this makes them ideal candidates for on-chip optical computing.

== History ==
Albert Einstein proposed the stimulated emission in 1916, which contributed to the first demonstration of laser in 1961. From then on, people have been pursuing the miniaturization of lasers for more compact size and less energy consumption all the time. Since people noticed that light has different interactions with matter at the nanoscale in the 1990s, significant progress has been made to achieve the miniaturization of lasers and increase power conversion efficiency. Various types of nanolasers have been developed over the past decades.

In the 1990s, some intriguing designs of microdisk laser and photonic crystal laser were demonstrated to have cavity size or energy volume with micro-/nano- diameters and approach the diffraction limit of light. Photoluminescence behavior of bulk ZnO nanowires was first reported in 2001 by Prof. Peidong Yang from the University of California, Berkeley and it opened the door to the study of nanowire nanolasers. These designs still do not exceed the diffraction limit until the demonstration of plasmonic lasers or spasers.

David J. Bergman and Mark Stockman first proposed amplified surface plasmon waves by stimulated emission and coined the term spaser as "surface plasmon amplification by stimulated emission of radiation" in 2003. Until 2009, the plasmonic nanolasers or spasers were first achieved experimentally, which were regarded as the smallest nanolasers at that time.

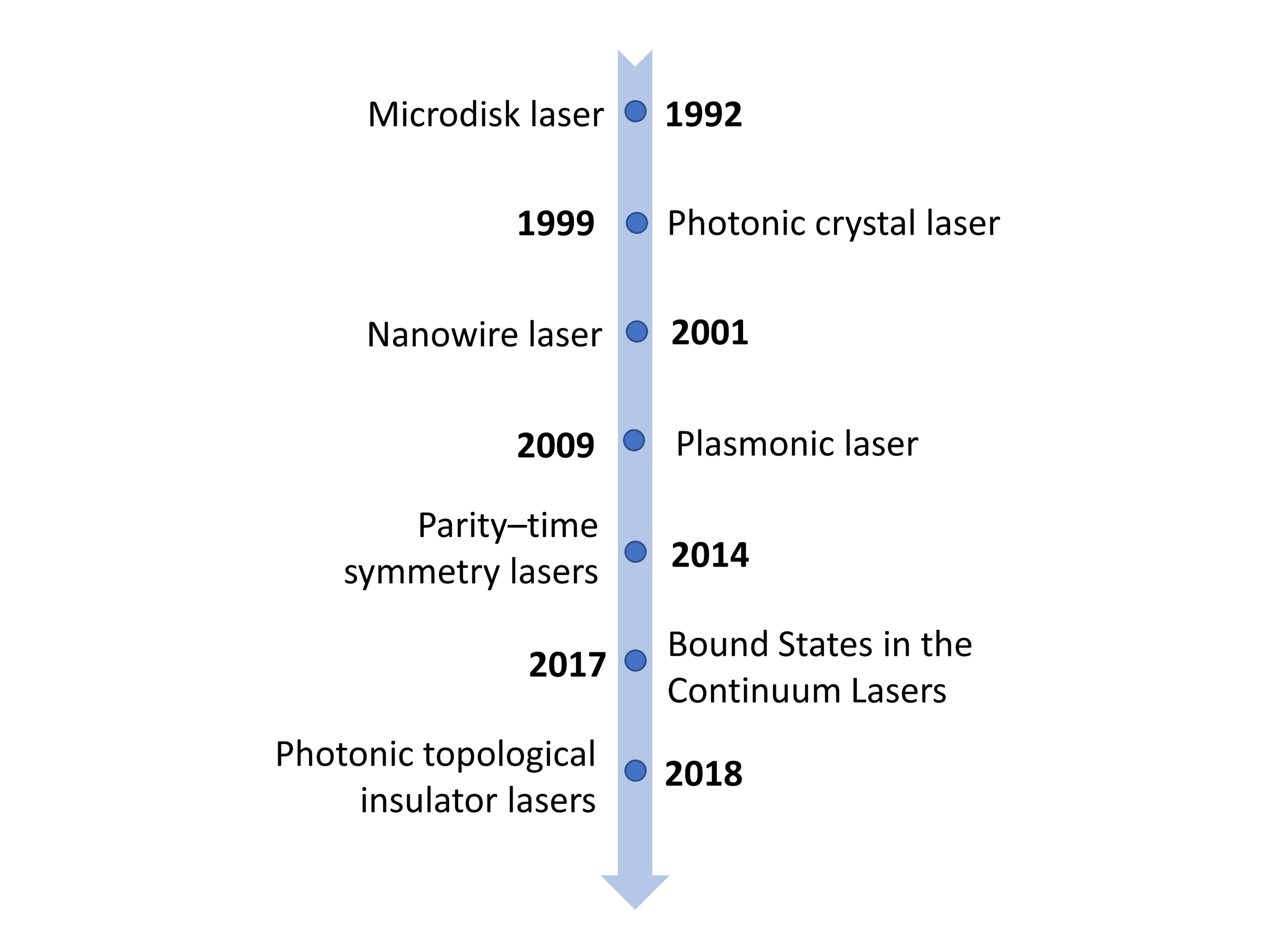
Development timeline of nanolasers.

Since roughly 2010, there has been progress in nanolaser technology, and new types of nanolasers have been developed, such as parity-time symmetry laser, bound states in the continuum laser and photonic topological insulators laser.

== Comparison with conventional lasers ==
While sharing many similarities with standard lasers, nanolasers maintain many unique features and differences from the conventional lasers due to the fact that light interacts differently with matter at the nanoscale.

=== Mechanism ===
Similar to the conventional lasers, nanolasers also based on stimulated emission which was proposed by Einstein; the main difference between nanolaser and the conventional ones in mechanism is light confinement. The resonator or cavity plays an important role in selecting the light with a certain frequency and the same direction as the most priority amplification and suppressing the other light to achieve the confinement of light. For conventional lasers, Fabry–Pérot cavity with two parallel reflection mirrors is applied. In the case of nanowires, it was shown that the two ends of a nanowire acting as scatters, rather than two parallel mirrors as in the case of Fabry–Pérot cavity, provide the feedback mechanism for nanowire lasers. In this case, light could be confined to a maximum of half its wavelength and such limit is deemed the diffraction limit of light. To approach or decrease the diffraction limit of light, one way is to improve the reflectivity of gain medium, such as using photonic bandgap and nanowires. Another effective way to exceed the diffraction limit is to convert light into surface plasmons in nanostructuralized metals, for amplification in cavity. Recently, new mechanisms of strong light confinement for nanolasers including parity–time symmetry, photonic topological insulators, and bound states in the continuum have been proposed.

=== Properties ===
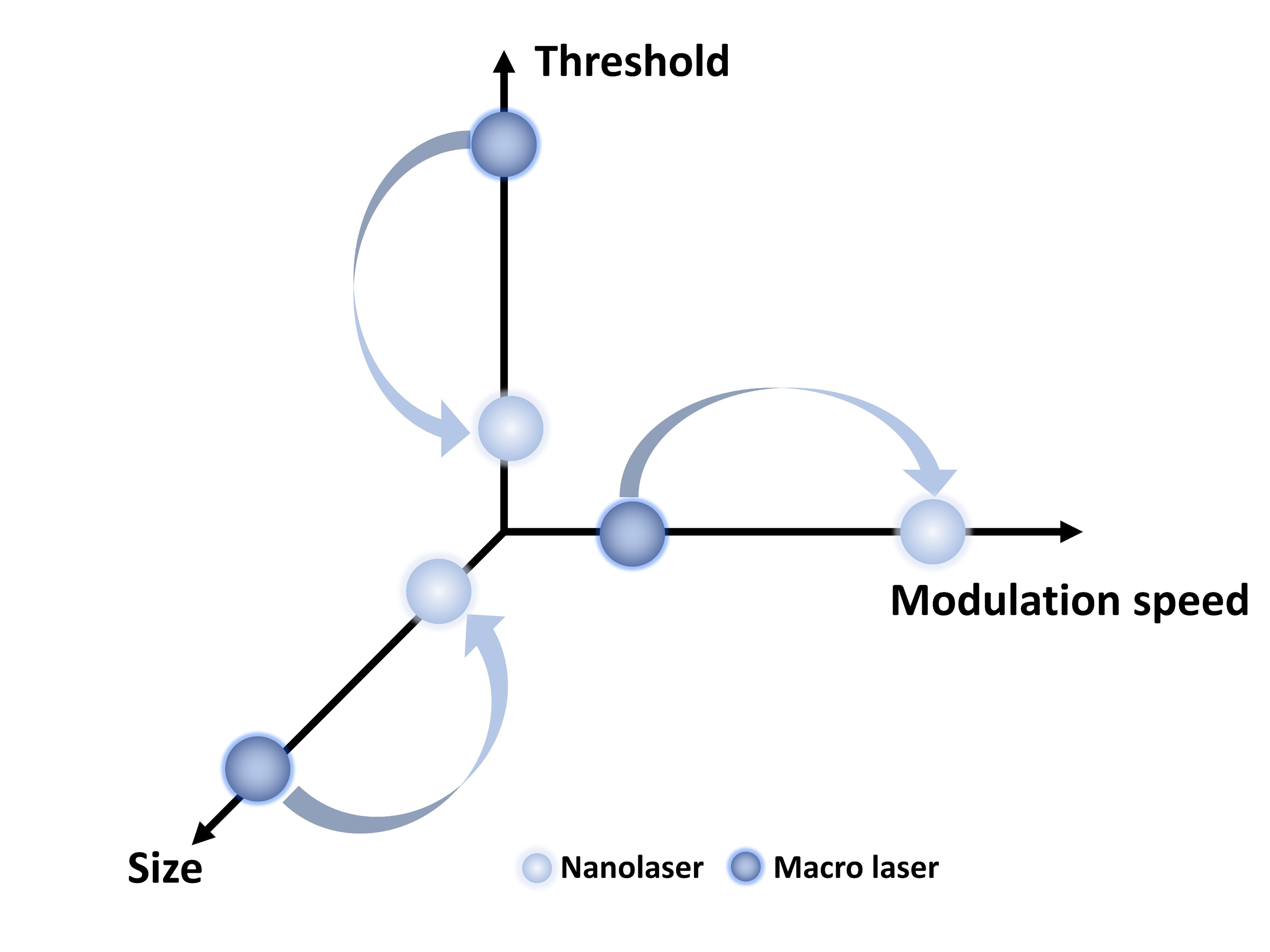
Comparison of nanolasers and macro lasers in properties. Compared with macro lasers, nanolasers have decreased sizes, lower thresholds and accelerated modulation speeds.

Compared with conventional lasers, nanolasers show distinct properties and capabilities. The biggest advantages of nanolasers are their ultra-small physical volumes to improve energy efficiencies, decrease lasing thresholds, and achieve high modulation speeds.

== Types ==
=== Microdisk laser ===
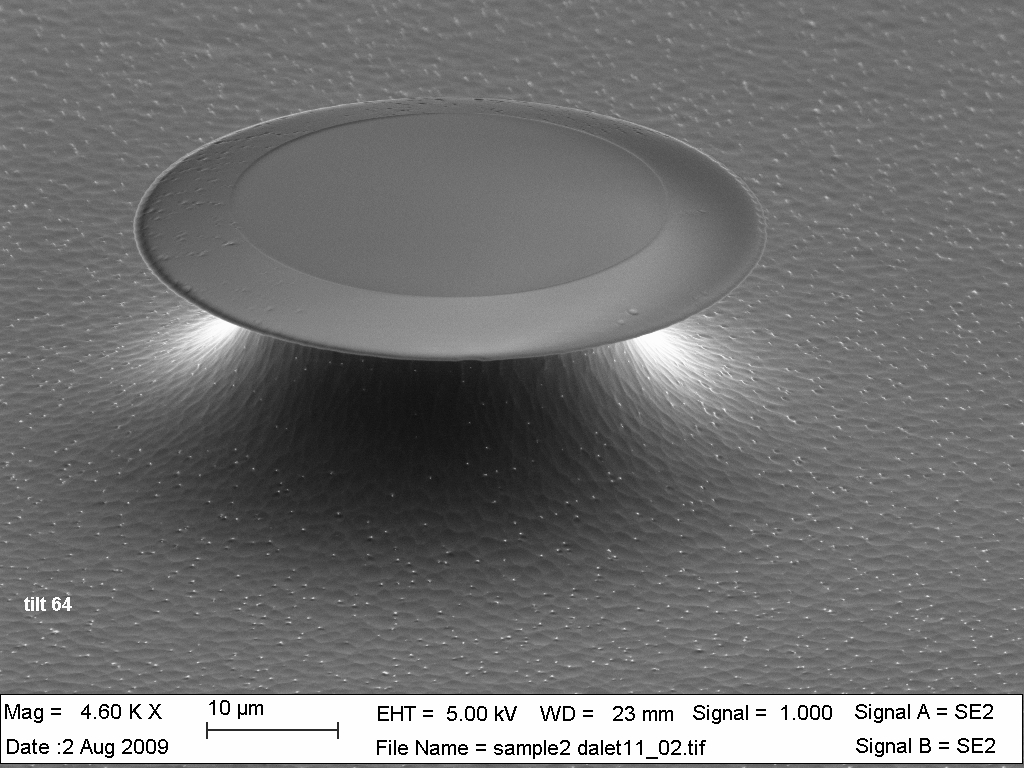
SEM image of microdisk laser with a whispering-gallery mode resonator.

A microdisk laser is a very small laser consisting of a disk with quantum well structures built into it. Its dimensions can exist on the micro-scale or nano-scale. Microdisk lasers use a whispering-gallery mode resonant cavity. The light in cavity travels around the perimeter of the disk and the total internal reflection of photons can result in a strong light confinement and a high quality factor, which means a powerful ability of the microcavity to store the energy of photons coupled into the cavity.

=== Photonic crystal laser ===
Photonic crystal lasers utilize periodic dielectric structures with different refractive indices; light can be confined with the use of a photonic crystal microcavity. In dielectric materials, there is orderly spatial distribution. When there is a defect in the periodic structure, the two-dimensional or three-dimensional photonic crystal structure will confine the light in the space of the diffractive limit and produce the Fano resonance phenomenon, which means a high quality factor with a strong light confinement for lasers. The fundamental feature of photonic crystals is the photonic bandgap, that is, the light whose frequency falls in the photonic band gap cannot propagate in the crystal structure, thus resulting in a high reflectivity for incident light and a strong confinement of light to a small volume of wavelength scale. The appearance of photonic crystals makes the spontaneous emission in the photon gap completely suppressed. But the high cost of photonic crystal impedes the development and spreading applications of photonic crystal lasers.

=== Nanowire laser ===
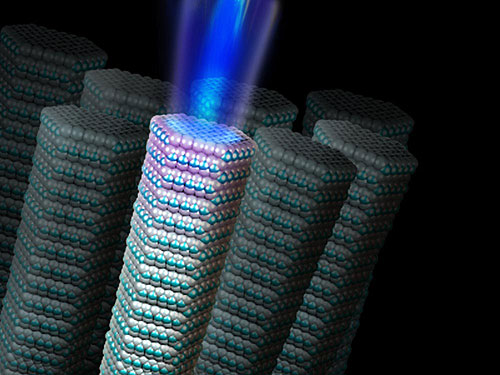
Scheme of nanowire lasers.

Semiconductor nanowire lasers have a quasi-one-dimensional structure with diameters ranging from a few nanometers to a few hundred nanometers and lengths ranging from hundreds of nanometers to a few microns. The width of nanowires is large enough to ignore the quantum size effect, but they are high quality one-dimensional waveguides with cylindrical, rectangular, trigonal, and hexagonal cross-sections. The quasi-one-dimensional structure and high feedback provided by scattering of light at the nanowire ends makes it have good optical waveguide and the ability of light confinement. Nanowire lasers are similar to Fabry–Pérot cavity in mechanism, but different in quantitative reflection coefficients High reflectivity of nanowire and flat end facets of the wire constitute a good resonant cavity, in which photons can be bound between the two ends of the nanowire to limit the light energy to the axial direction of the nanowire, thus meeting the conditions for laser formation. Polygonal nanowires can form a nearly circular cavity in cross section that supports whispering-gallery mode.

=== Plasmonic nanolaser ===
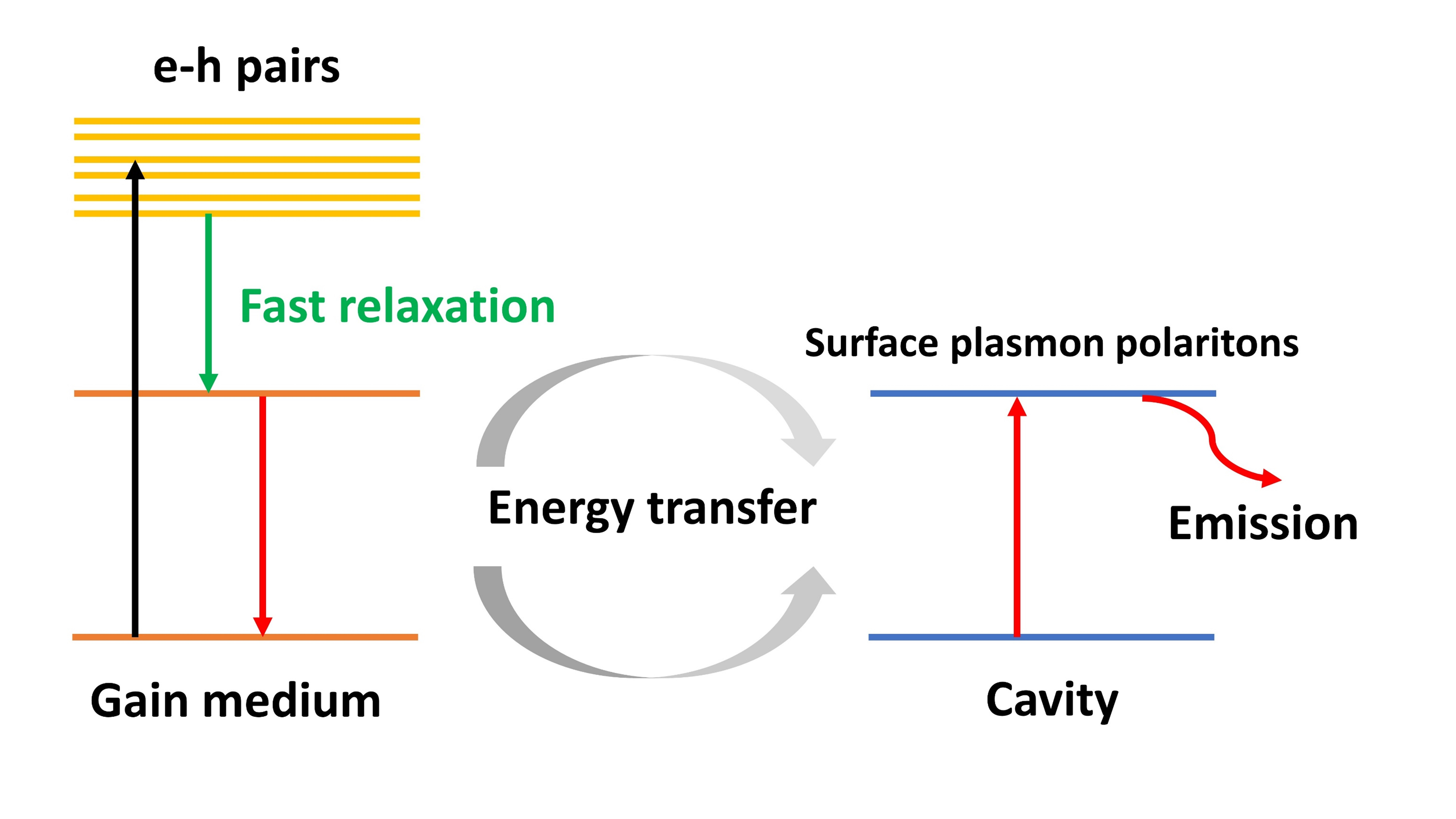
Schematic illustration of a plasmonic nanolaser. The process of lasing formation includes energy transfer convert photons into surface plasmons.

Nanolasers based on surface plasmons are known as plasmonic nanolasers, with sizes far exceeding the diffraction limit of light. If a plasmonic nanolaser is nanoscopic in three dimensions, it is also called a spaser, which is known to have the smallest cavity size and mode size. Design of plasmonic nanolaser has become one of the most effective technology methods for laser miniaturization at present. A little bit different from the conventional lasers, a typical configuration of plasmonic nanolaser includes a process of energy transfer to convert photons into surface plasmons. In plasmonic nanolaser or spaser, the exciton is not photons anymore but surface plasmon polariton. Surface plasmons are collective oscillations of free electrons on metal surfaces under the action of external electromagnetic fields. According to their manifestations, the cavity mode in plasmonic nanolasers can be divided into the propagating surface plasmon polaritons (SPPs) and the non-propagating localized surface plasmons (LSPs).

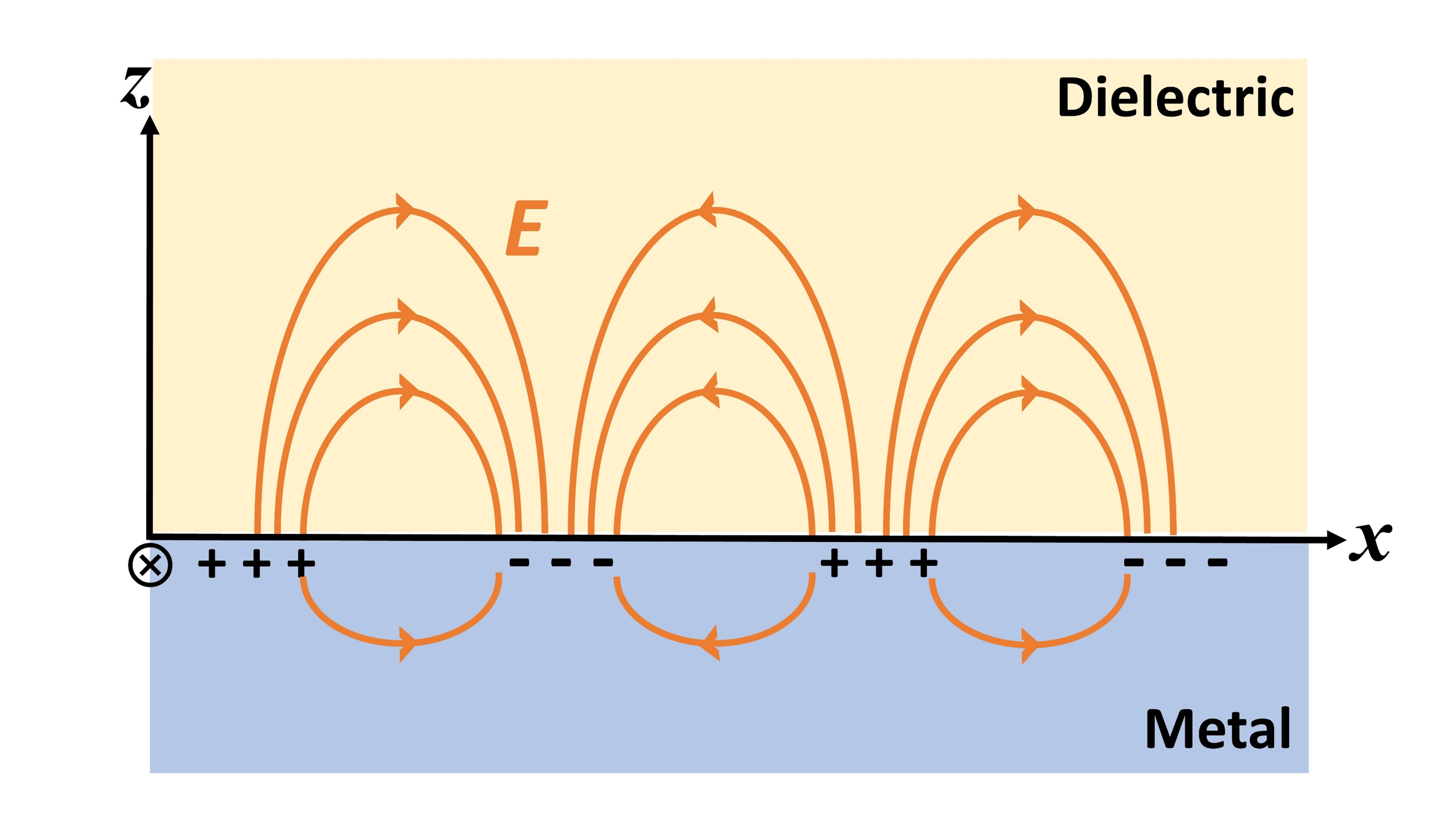
Schematic of a SPP mode, where surface plasmon polaritons propagate along an interface between metal and dielectric.

SPPs are electromagnetic waves that propagate along the interface between metal and medium, and their intensities decay gradually in the direction perpendicular to the propagation interface. In 2008, Oulton experimentally validated a plasma nanowire laser consisting of a thin dielectric layer with a low reflectivity growing on a metal surface and a gain layer with a high refractive index semiconductor nanowire. In this structure, the electromagnetic field can be transferred from the metal layer to the intermediate gap layer, so that the mode energy is highly concentrated, thus greatly reducing the energy loss in the metal.

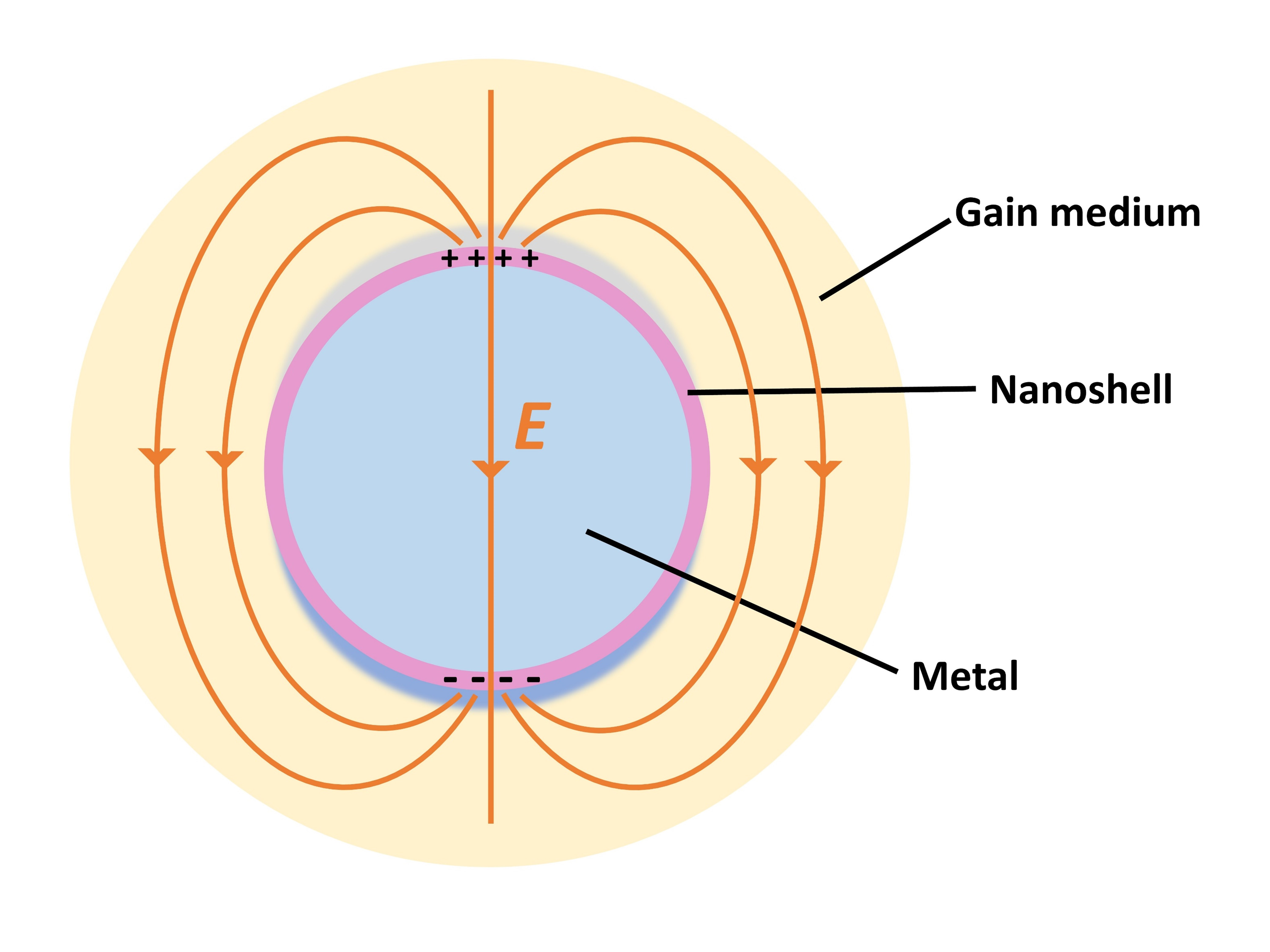
Schematic of configuration of a 3D spaser surrounded by a gain medium based on localized surface plasmons. Metal core provides plasmon mode and surface plasmon polaritons are formed on the surface of nanoshell with a silicon dioxide doped with dye as gain medium.

The LSP mode exists in a variety of different metal nanostructures, such as metal nanoparticles (nanospheres, nanorods, nanocubes, etc.) and arrays of nanoparticles. Unlike the propagating surface plasmon polaritons, the localized surface plasmon does not propagate along the surface, but oscillates back and forth in the nanostructure in the form of standing waves. When light is incident to the surface of a metal nanoparticles, it causes a real displacement of the surface charge relative to the ions. The attraction between electrons and ions allows for the oscillation of electrode cloud and the formation of local surface from polarization excimer. The oscillation of electrons is determined by the geometrical boundaries of different metal nanoparticles. When its resonance frequency is consistent with the incident electromagnetic field, it will form the localized surface plasmon resonance. In 2009, Mikhail A. Noginov of Norfolk State University in the United States successfully verified the LSPs-based nanolaser for the first time. The nanolaser in this paper was composed of an Au core providing the plasmon mode and a silicon dioxide doped with OG-488 dye providing the gain medium. The diameter of the Au core was 14 nm, the thickness of the silica layer was 15 nm, and the diameter of the whole device was only 44 nm, which was the smallest nanolaser at that time.

=== New types of nanolasers ===
In addition, there have been some new types of nanolasers developed in recent years to approach the diffraction limit. Parity-time symmetry is related to a balance of optical gain and loss in a coupled cavity system. When the gain–loss contrast and coupling constant between two identical, closely located cavities are controlled, the phase transition of lasing modes occurs at an exceptional point. Bound states in the continuum laser confines light in an open system via the elimination of radiation states through destructive interference between resonant modes. A photonic topological insulator laser is based on topological insulators optical mode, where the topological states is confined within the cavity boundaries and they can be used for the formation of laser. All of those new types of nanolasers have high quality factor and can achieve cavity size and mode size approaching the diffraction limit of the light.

== Applications ==
Due to their capabilities, including low lasing thresholds, high energy efficiencies and high modulation speeds, nanolasers may have new practical applications in the fields of materials characterization, integrated optical interconnects, and sensing.

=== Nanolasers for material characterization ===
The intense optical fields of such a laser also enable the enhancement effect in non-linear optics or surface-enhanced-raman-scattering (SERS). Nanowire nanolasers can be capable of optical detection at the scale of a single molecule with high resolution and ultrafast modulation.

=== Nanolasers for integrated optical interconnects ===
The Internet is developing at an extremely high speed with large energy consumption for data communication. The high energy efficiency of nanolasers plays an important role in decreasing energy consumption for future society.

=== Nanolasers for sensing ===
Plasmonic nanolaser sensors have recently been demonstrated that can detect specific molecules in air and be used for optical biosensors. Molecules can modify the surface of metal nanoparticles and impact the surface recombination velocity of gain medium of a plasmonic nanolaser, which contributes to the sensing mechanism of plasmonic nanolasers.

== Challenges ==
Although nanolasers have shown great potential, there are still some challenges towards the large-scale use of nanolasers, for example, electrically injected nanolasers, cavity configuration engineering and metal quality improvement. For nanolasers, the realization of electrically injected or pumped operation at room temperature is a key step towards its practical application. However, most nanolaser are optically pumped and the realization of electrically injected nanolasers is still a main technical challenge at present. Only a few studies have reported electrically injected nanolasers. Moreover, it still remains a challenge to realize cavity configuration engineering and metal quality improvement, which are crucial to satisfy the high-performance requirement of nanolasers and achieve their applications. Recently, nanolaser arrays show great potential to increase the power efficiency and accelerate modulation speed.

== See also ==
- Laser
- List of laser articles
- Nanowire laser
- Polariton laser
- Spaser, plasmonic laser
