= Dorje C. Brody =

British applied mathematician and physicist

- Born: 1970 (age 55–56); Hong Kong
- Education: Niigata University (BSc) Imperial College London (PhD)
- Known for: PT Symmetry | Hilbert–Pólya conjecture | Geometric quantum mechanics | Information-based asset pricing theory
- Scientific career
- Fields: Mathematical Physics; Financial Mathematics
- Doctoral advisor: Ray Rivers

Dorje C. Brody (born 1970 in Hong Kong) is a British applied mathematician and mathematical physicist.

== Career ==
Dorje C. Brody was born in Hong Kong, but lived in Japan for a number of years. He received his BSc in physics at Niigata University and earned an MSc and PhD degrees in theoretical physics from Imperial.

Brody held a PPARC (Particle Physics and Astronomy Research Council) research fellowship in the Department of Applied Mathematics and Theoretical Physics in Cambridge University, in conjunction with a Research Fellowship at Churchill College. In 1999 he returned to Imperial College as a Royal Society University Research Fellow. In 2004 Brody was invited to the Imperial Palace in Tokyo as an Outstanding Young Person to meet the Emperor of Japan. Brody has been a full professor since 2011 and since 2018 he has held a Chair in Mathematics at the University of Surrey in the UK.

Brody's research covers a broad range of topics in applied mathematics and theoretical physics. During the early part of his career he focused on statistical mechanics, which led naturally to stochastic processes and financial mathematics in one direction and to thermodynamics and quantum mechanics in another. Brody's work has covered information geometry and geometric quantum theory as well as foundational issues in quantum theory, quantum statistical mechanics and quantum cosmology in theoretical physics; and using concepts of information geometry, nonlinear filtering and information asymmetry in financial mathematics. He is a member of the editorial boards of Journal of Physics A: Mathematical and Theoretical, International Journal of Theoretical and Applied Finance and Information Geometry.

Brody has published more than 100 papers with his most recognisable contributions being in the complex extension of quantum mechanics known as PT-symmetric quantum mechanics, and in the introduction of information-based asset pricing theory. Recently, his work (with Carl M. Bender and Markus Müller) on the Hilbert–Pólya conjecture received significant attention. While Bellissard gave arguments suggesting that the strategy proposed does not work, his arguments were rebutted and a subsequent paper by Brody and Bender proved formally that their original claims were correct.

Dorje C. Brody has held long-term collaborations with Carl M. Bender, Gary W. Gibbons and Lane P. Hughston.
