= Mikhail Tsapenko =

Soviet and Russian scientist

Mikhail Petrovich Tsapenko (Russian: Михаил Петрович Цапенко; 1919–2008) was a Soviet and Russian scientist, doctor of technical sciences, professor (1988), Honored Worker of Science and Technology of the RSFSR, measuring equipment specialist.

== Biography ==
Tsapenko was born on January 12, 1919. In 1941 he graduated as an electrical engineer from the Tomsk Industrial Institute. In 1941–1946, he served in the Red Army.

In 1946–1950, the scientist took a number of engineering positions at the Siberian Scientific Research Institute Of Aviation (SibNIA), and then was the head of laboratory (1950–1959) in this organization. From 1959 to 1968, he was deputy director of the Institute of Automation and Electrometry.

In 1968–1988, he headed the department at the Novosibirsk Electrotechnical Institute.

He died in 2008. In the last period of his life, Tsapenko worked as a scientific consultant at the Tecnological Design Institute of Scientific Instrument Engineering.

== Scientific activity ==
At the SibNIA, Tsapenko organized the research area for the study of circuits and the creation of measuring instruments for strength testing of aviation equipment.

== Awards ==
He was awarded the Order of the Red Banner of Labour, the Order of the Badge of Honour and medals.
