= Carl Bender =

Carl Bender may refer to:

- Carl M. Bender (born 1943), American professor of physics
- Carl Jacob Bender, missionary pioneer to Cameroon
