= Hilbert–Pólya conjecture =

Mathematical conjecture about the Riemann zeta function

In mathematics, the Hilbert–Pólya conjecture states that the non-trivial zeros of the Riemann zeta function correspond to eigenvalues of a self-adjoint operator. It is a possible approach to the Riemann hypothesis, by means of spectral theory.

== History ==
In a letter to Andrew Odlyzko, dated January 3, 1982, George Pólya said that while he was in Göttingen around 1912 to 1914 he was asked by Edmund Landau for a physical reason that the Riemann hypothesis should be true, and suggested that this would be the case if the imaginary parts t of the zeros

$$\tfrac12 + it$$

of the Riemann zeta function corresponded to eigenvalues of a self-adjoint operator. The earliest published statement of the conjecture seems to be in Montgomery (1973).

David Hilbert did not work in the central areas of analytic number theory, but his name has become known for the Hilbert–Pólya conjecture due to a story told by Ernst Hellinger, a student of Hilbert, to André Weil. Hellinger said that Hilbert announced in his seminar in the early 1900s that he expected the Riemann Hypothesis would be a consequence of Fredholm's work on integral equations with a symmetric kernel.

=== 1950s and the Selberg trace formula ===
At the time of Pólya's conversation with Landau, there was little basis for such speculation. However Selberg in the early 1950s proved a duality between the length spectrum of a Riemann surface and the eigenvalues of its Laplacian. This so-called Selberg trace formula bore a striking resemblance to the explicit formulae, which gave credibility to the Hilbert–Pólya conjecture.

=== 1970s and random matrices ===
Hugh Montgomery investigated and found that the statistical distribution of the zeros on the critical line has a certain property, now called Montgomery's pair correlation conjecture. The zeros tend not to cluster too closely together, but to repel. Visiting at the Institute for Advanced Study in 1972, he showed this result to Freeman Dyson, one of the founders of the theory of random matrices.

Dyson saw that the statistical distribution found by Montgomery appeared to be the same as the pair correlation distribution for the eigenvalues of a random Hermitian matrix. These distributions are of importance in physics — the eigenstates of a Hamiltonian, for example the energy levels of an atomic nucleus, satisfy such statistics. Subsequent work has strongly borne out the connection between the distribution of the zeros of the Riemann zeta function and the eigenvalues of a random Hermitian matrix drawn from the Gaussian unitary ensemble, and both are now believed to obey the same statistics. Thus the Hilbert–Pólya conjecture now has a more solid basis, though it has not yet led to a proof of the Riemann hypothesis.

=== Later developments ===
In 1998, Alain Connes formulated a trace formula that is actually equivalent to the Riemann hypothesis. This strengthened the analogy with the Selberg trace formula to the point where it gives precise statements. He gives a geometric interpretation of the explicit formula of number theory as a trace formula on noncommutative geometry of Adele classes.

== Possible connection with quantum mechanics ==
A possible connection of Hilbert–Pólya operator with quantum mechanics was given by Pólya. The Hilbert–Pólya conjecture operator is of the form $\tfrac{1}{2}+iH$ where $H$ is the Hamiltonian of a particle of mass $m$ that is moving under the influence of a potential $V(x)$. The Riemann conjecture is equivalent to the assertion that the Hamiltonian is Hermitian, or equivalently that $V$ is real.

Using perturbation theory to first order, the energy of the nth eigenstate is related to the expectation value of the potential:

$$E_{n}=E_{n}^{0}+ \left. \left \langle \varphi^{0}_n \right | V \left | \varphi^{0}_n \right. \right \rangle$$

where $E^{0}_n$ and $\varphi^{0}_n$ are the eigenvalues and eigenstates of the free particle Hamiltonian. This equation can be taken to be a Fredholm integral equation of first kind, with the energies $E_n$. Such integral equations may be solved by means of the resolvent kernel, so that the potential may be written as

$$V(x)=A\int_{-\infty}^{\infty} \left (g(k)+\overline{g(k)}-E_{k}^{0} \right )\,R(x,k)\,dk$$

where $R(x,k)$ is the resolvent kernel, $A$ is a real constant and

$$g(k)=i \sum_{n=0}^{\infty} \left(\frac{1}{2}-\rho_n \right)\delta(k-n)$$

where $\delta(k-n)$ is the Dirac delta function, and the $\rho_n$ are the "non-trivial" roots of the zeta function $\zeta (\rho_n)=0$.

Michael Berry and Jonathan Keating have speculated that the Hamiltonian H is actually some quantization of the classical Hamiltonian xp, where p is the canonical momentum associated with x The simplest Hermitian operator corresponding to xp is

$$\hat{H} = \tfrac1{2} (\hat{x}\hat{p}+\hat{p}\hat{x}) = - i \left( x \frac{\mathrm{d}}{\mathrm{d} x} + \frac1{2} \right).$$

This refinement of the Hilbert–Pólya conjecture is known as the Berry conjecture (or the Berry–Keating conjecture). As of 2008, it is still quite far from being concrete, as it is not clear on which space this operator should act in order to get the correct dynamics, nor how to regularize it in order to get the expected logarithmic corrections. Berry and Keating have conjectured that since this operator is invariant under dilations perhaps the boundary condition f(nx) = f(x) for integer n may help to get the correct asymptotic results valid for large n

$\frac{1}{2} + i \frac{ 2\pi n}{\log n}.$

A paper was published in March 2017, written by Carl M. Bender, Dorje C. Brody, and Markus P. Müller, which builds on Berry's approach to the problem. There the operator

$$\hat{H} = \frac{1}{1-e^{-i\hat{p}}} \left (\hat{x}\hat{p}+\hat{p}\hat{x} \right ) \left (1-e^{-i\hat{p}} \right )$$

was introduced, which they claim satisfies a certain modified versions of the conditions of the Hilbert–Pólya conjecture. Jean Bellissard has criticized this paper, and the authors have responded with clarifications.

== See also ==
- Riemann hypothesis § Operator theory
- Wu–Sprung potential
