= Nanowire laser =

Very small light-emitting device

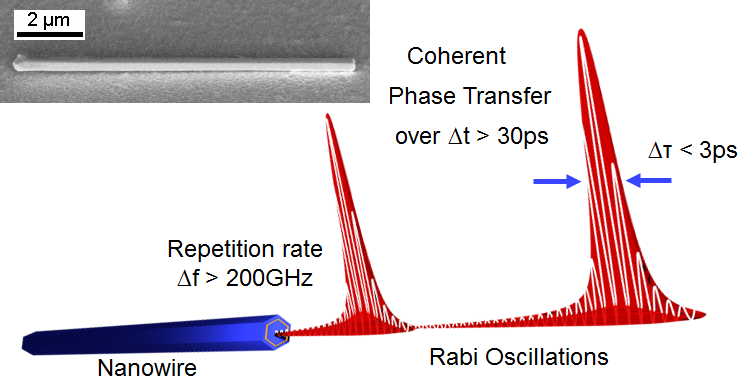
Nanowire lasers for ultrafast transmission of information in light pulses

Semiconductor nanowire lasers are nano-scaled lasers that can be embedded on chips and constitute an advance for computing and information-processing applications. Nanowire lasers are coherent light sources (single-mode optical waveguides) as with any other laser device, with the advantage of operating at the nanoscale. Built by molecular-beam epitaxy, nanowire lasers offer the possibility for direct integration on silicon, and the construction of optical interconnects and data communication at the chip scale. Nanowire lasers are built from III–V semiconductor heterostructures. Their unique 1D configurations and high refractive indices allow for low optical losses and recirculation in the active nanowire core region. This enables subwavelength laser sizes of only a few hundred nanometers. Nanowires are Fabry–Perot resonator cavities defined by the end facets of the wire; therefore, they do not require polishing or cleaving for high-reflectivity facets as in conventional lasers.

== Properties ==
Nanowire lasers can be grown site-selectively on silicon or silicon-on-insulator wafers with conventional MBE techniques, allowing for pristine structural quality without defects. Nanowire lasers using the group-III nitride and ZnO materials systems have been demonstrated to emit in the visible and ultraviolet; however, infrared at the 1.3–1.55 μm region is important for telecommunication bands. Lasing at those wavelengths has been achieved by removing the nanowire from the silicon substrate. Nanowire lasers have shown pulse durations down to < 1 ps, and enable repetition rates greater than 200 GHz. Also, nanowire lasers have been shown to store the phase information of a pulse over 30 ps when excited with subsequent pulse pairs. Mode-locked lasers at the nanoscale are therefore feasible with such configurations.

== See also ==
- Molecular beam epitaxy
- Nanolaser
- Nanowires
- Semiconductor lasers
