= Quantum state purification =

Concept in quantum information theory

In quantum information theory, quantum state purification refers to the process of representing a mixed state as a pure quantum state of higher-dimensional Hilbert space. The purification allows the original mixed state to be recovered by taking the partial trace over the additional degrees of freedom. The purification is not unique, the different purifications that can lead to the same mixed states are limited by the Schrödinger–HJW theorem.

Purification is used in algorithms such as entanglement distillation, magic state distillation and algorithmic cooling.

== Description ==
Let $\mathcal H_S$ be a finite-dimensional complex Hilbert space, and consider a generic (possibly mixed) quantum state $\rho$ defined on $\mathcal H_S$ and admitting a decomposition of the form
$$\rho = \sum_i p_i|\phi_i\rangle\langle\phi_i|$$
for a collection of (not necessarily mutually orthogonal) states $|\phi_i\rangle \in \mathcal H_S$ and coefficients $p_i \ge 0$ such that $\sum_i p_i = 1$. Note that any quantum state can be written in such a way for some $\{|\phi_i\rangle\}_i$ and $\{p_i\}_i$.

Any such $\rho$ can be purified, that is, represented as the partial trace of a pure state defined in a larger Hilbert space. More precisely, it is always possible to find a (finite-dimensional) Hilbert space $\mathcal H_A$ and a pure state $|\Psi_{SA}\rangle \in \mathcal H_S \otimes \mathcal H_A$ such that $\rho = \operatorname{Tr}_A\big(|\Psi_{SA}\rangle\langle\Psi_{SA}|\big)$. Furthermore, the states $|\Psi_{SA}\rangle$ satisfying this are all and only those of the form
$$|\Psi_{SA}\rangle = \sum_i \sqrt{p_i} |\phi_i\rangle \otimes |a_i\rangle$$
for some orthonormal basis $\{|a_i\rangle\}_i \subset \mathcal H_A$. The state $|\Psi_{SA}\rangle$ is then referred to as the "purification of $\rho$". Since the auxiliary space and the basis can be chosen arbitrarily, the purification of a mixed state is not unique; in fact, there are infinitely many purifications of a given mixed state. Because all of them admit a decomposition in the form given above, given any pair of purifications $|\Psi\rangle, |\Psi'\rangle \in \mathcal H_S \otimes \mathcal H_A$, there is always some unitary operation $U : \mathcal H_A \to \mathcal H_A$ such that
$$|\Psi'\rangle = (I\otimes U) |\Psi\rangle.$$

== Schrödinger–HJW theorem ==
The Schrödinger–HJW theorem is a result about the realization of a mixed state of a quantum system as an ensemble of pure quantum states and the relation between the corresponding purifications of the density operators. The theorem is named after Erwin Schrödinger who proved it in 1936, and after Lane P. Hughston, Richard Jozsa and William Wootters who rediscovered in 1993. The result was also found independently (albeit partially) by Nicolas Hadjisavvas building upon work by E. T. Jaynes of 1957, and Nicolas Gisin in 1989, while a significant part of it was likewise independently discovered by N. David Mermin in 1999 who discovered the link with Schrödinger's work. Thanks to its complicated history, it is also known by various other names such as the GHJW theorem, the HJW theorem, and the purification theorem.

Consider a mixed quantum state $\rho$ with two different realizations as ensemble of pure states as $\rho = \sum_i p_i |\phi_i\rangle\langle\phi_i|$ and $\rho = \sum_j q_j |\varphi_j\rangle\langle\varphi_j|$. Here both $|\phi_i\rangle$and $|\varphi_j\rangle$ are not assumed to be mutually orthogonal. There will be two corresponding purifications of the mixed state $\rho$ reading as follows:

Purification 1: $|\Psi_{SA}^1\rangle=\sum_i\sqrt{p_i}|\phi_i\rangle \otimes |a_i\rangle$;
Purification 2: $|\Psi_{SA}^2\rangle=\sum_j\sqrt{q_j}|\varphi_j\rangle \otimes |b_j\rangle$.

The sets $\{|a_i\rangle\}$and $\{|b_j\rangle\}$ are two collections of orthonormal bases of the respective auxiliary spaces. These two purifications only differ by a unitary transformation acting on the auxiliary space, namely, there exists a unitary matrix $U_A$ such that $|\Psi^1_{SA}\rangle = (I\otimes U_A)|\Psi^2_{SA}\rangle$. Therefore, $|\Psi_{SA}^1\rangle = \sum_j \sqrt{q_j}|\varphi_j\rangle\otimes U_A|b_j\rangle$, which means that we can realize the different ensembles of a mixed state just by making different measurements on the purifying system.
