= Tecnological Design Institute of Scientific Instrument Engineering =

Research institute in Novosibirsk, Russia

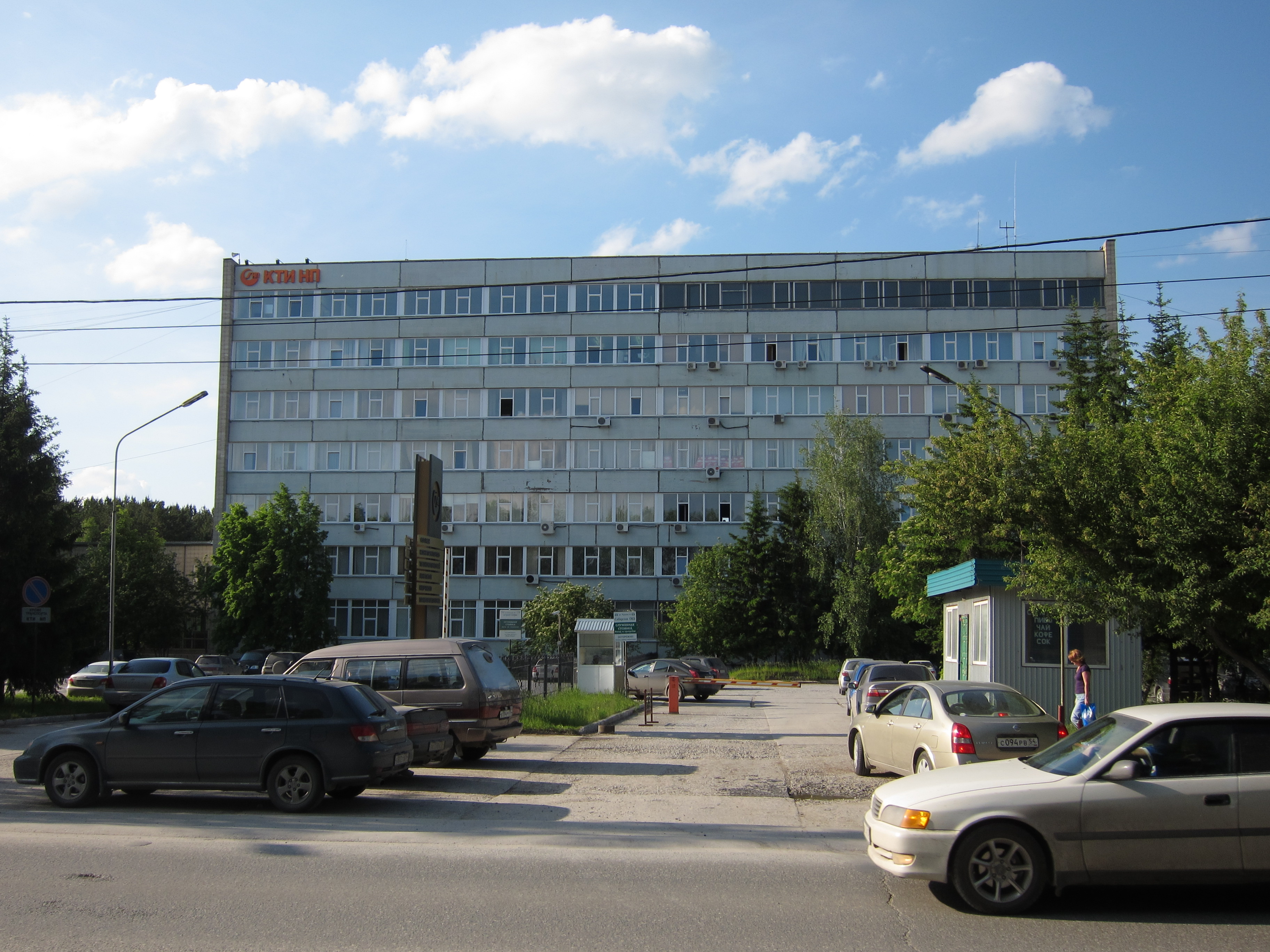
- Established: 1962
- Owner: Siberian Branch of RAS
- Address: Russkaya Street 41, Novosibirsk, 630058, Russia
- Location: Novosibirsk, Russia
- Website: www.tdisie.nsc.ru

Tecnological Design Institute of Scientific Instrument Engineering of the Siberian Branch of the RAS, TDI SIE SB RAS (Russian: Конструкторско-технологический институт научного приборостроения СО РАН, КТИ НП СО РАН) is a research institute in Novosibirsk, Russia. It was founded in 1962.

== History ==
In 1962, Special Design Bureau of Scientific Instrument Engineering was established as part of the Institute of Chemical Kinetics and Combustion, but in 1968, the bureau became part of the Institute of Automation and Electrometry for the development of design documentation and production of systems of automation of scientific researches, together with the Pilot Plant.

In 1991, the bureau was transformed into the Design and Technology Institute of Scientific Instrument Engineering.

At the beginning of 2002, 200 people worked at the organization, including 2 doctors of sciences and 9 candidates of sciences.

== Activity ==
Laser technologies and high-resolution precision systems, measurement technology, optics of three-dimensional objects, smart problem-oriented non-destructive testing systems, vision systems, development and creation of products for the automotive, nuclear and mining industries, as well as products for railway transport, development of dimensional control systems.

The TDI SIE, together with the Institute of Automation and Electrometry, developed laser circular recording systems (photoplotters) CLWS-300 and CLWS-300M, which were exported to Italy, Germany and China.

== Sources of income ==
According to the Novosibirsk Encyclopedia, published in 2003, the receipt of budget funds was insignificant (10–15%) and revenues mainly came from contracts with Russian and foreign organizations.
