= Non-Hermitian quantum mechanics =

Concept in physics

In physics, non-Hermitian quantum mechanics describes quantum mechanical systems where Hamiltonians are not Hermitian. These Hamiltonians are typically characterized by complex energies indicative of underlying interactions of the system with an environment through gain and loss channels. Non-Hermitian systems exhibit markedly distinct behavior from Hermitian analogs arising from the intrinsic asymmetry in the Hamiltonian matrix. A few of the most interesting phenomena arising in such systems are the concept of exceptional points, heightened sensitivity to boundary conditions and the non-Hermitian skin effect.

== History ==
The first paper that has "non-Hermitian quantum mechanics" in the title was published in 1996 by Naomichi Hatano and David R. Nelson. The authors mapped a classical statistical model of flux-line pinning by columnar defects in high-T_{c} superconductors to a quantum model by means of an inverse path-integral mapping and ended up with a non-Hermitian Hamiltonian with an imaginary vector potential in a random scalar potential. They further mapped this into a lattice model and came up with a tight-binding model with asymmetric hopping, which is now widely called the Hatano-Nelson model. The authors showed that there is a region where all eigenvalues are real despite the non-Hermiticity.

Parity–time (PT) symmetry was initially studied as a specific system in non-Hermitian quantum mechanics. In 1998, physicist Carl Bender and former graduate student Stefan Boettcher published a paper where they found non-Hermitian Hamiltonians endowed with an unbroken PT symmetry (invariance with respect to the simultaneous action of the parity-inversion and time reversal symmetry operators) also may possess a real spectrum. Under a correctly defined inner product, a PT-symmetric Hamiltonian's eigenfunctions have positive norms and exhibit unitary time evolution, requirements for quantum theories. Bender won the 2017 Dannie Heineman Prize for Mathematical Physics for his work.

A closely related concept is that of pseudo-Hermitian operators, which were considered by physicists Paul Dirac, Wolfgang Pauli, and Tsung-Dao Lee and Gian Carlo Wick. Pseudo-Hermitian operators were discovered (or rediscovered) almost simultaneously by mathematicians Mark Krein and collaborators as G-Hamiltonian in the study of linear dynamical systems. The equivalence between pseudo-Hermiticity and G-Hamiltonian is easy to establish.

In the early 1960s, Olga Taussky, Michael Drazin, and Emilie Haynsworth demonstrated that the necessary and sufficient criteria for a finite-dimensional matrix to have real eigenvalues is that said matrix is pseudo-Hermitian with a positive-definite metric. In 2002, Ali Mostafazadeh showed that diagonalizable PT-symmetric Hamiltonians belong to the class of pseudo-Hermitian Hamiltonians. In 2003, it was proven that in finite dimensions, PT-symmetry is equivalent to pseudo-Hermiticity regardless of diagonalizability, thereby applying to the physically interesting case of non-diagonalizable Hamiltonians at exceptional points. This indicates that the mechanism of PT-symmetry breaking at exception points, where the Hamiltonian is usually not diagonalizable, is the Krein collision between two eigenmodes with opposite signs of actions.

In 2005, PT symmetry was introduced to the field of optics by the research group of Gonzalo Muga by noting that PT symmetry corresponds to the presence of balanced gain and loss. In 2007, the physicist Demetrios Christodoulides and his collaborators further studied the implications of PT symmetry in optics. The coming years saw the first experimental demonstrations of PT symmetry in passive and active systems. PT symmetry has also been applied to classical mechanics, metamaterials, electric circuits, and nuclear magnetic resonance. In 2017, a non-Hermitian PT-symmetric Hamiltonian was proposed by Dorje Brody and Markus Müller that "formally satisfies the conditions of the Hilbert–Pólya conjecture."

== Hatano–Nelson lattice ==
Simplified graphic of the Hatano Nelson lattice. The different colored arrows represent different hopping strengths depending on the direction of hopping in the lattice.

The Hatano–Nelson lattice is the simplest 1-D tight binding non-Hermitian model that consists of equally spaced lattice sites coupled with asymmetric hopping strengths $C+\Delta e^{i\varphi}$ and $C-\Delta e^{-i\varphi}$. The lattice Hamiltonian is described as follows.

$H = \sum_{m=1}^N(C+\Delta e^{i\varphi})c_{m+1}^\dagger c_m + (C-\Delta e^{-i\varphi})c_{m}^\dagger c_{m+1}$

Here $c_m^{\dagger}(c_m)$ represent the creation (annihilation) operators at the $m$th lattice site, $N$ is the total number of lattice sites, ($C, \Delta$) represent terms contributing to the asymmetric coupling between sites and $\varphi$ is the relative phase difference between $C$ and $\Delta$.

Hatano Nelson lattice energy eigen values under periodic (purple) and open (green) boundary conditions

Under periodic boundary conditions, the model supports complex eigen energy values that trace an ellipse in the complex energy plane. This ellipse defines the topological winding of the lattice making it a 1-D tightbinding model with point gap topology, not possible in the case of a 1-D Hermitian tightbinding lattice. As the boundary conditions transition from periodic to open boundary conditions, the ellipse shrinks and finally collapses onto the real energy axis. This collapse is associated with the non-Hermitian skin effect resulting in all of the eigen modes exponentially localizing at the boundary of the lattice.
