= Spaser =

Laser that uses surface plasmon polaritons

A spaser or plasmonic laser is a type of laser which aims to confine light at a subwavelength scale far below Rayleigh's diffraction limit of light by storing some of the light energy in electron oscillations called surface plasmon polaritons. The phenomenon was first described by David J. Bergman and Mark Stockman in 2003. The word spaser is an acronym for "surface plasmon amplification by stimulated emission of radiation". The first such devices were announced in 2009 by three groups: a 44-nanometer-diameter nanoparticle with a gold core surrounded by a dyed silica gain medium created by researchers from Purdue, Norfolk State and Cornell universities, a nanowire on a silver screen by a Berkeley group, and a semiconductor layer of 90 nm surrounded by silver pumped electrically by groups at the Eindhoven University of Technology and at Arizona State University. While the Purdue-Norfolk State-Cornell team demonstrated the confined plasmonic mode, the Berkeley team and the Eindhoven-Arizona State team demonstrated lasing in the so-called plasmonic gap mode. In 2018, a team from Northwestern University demonstrated a tunable nanolaser that can preserve its high mode quality by exploiting hybrid quadrupole plasmons as an optical feedback mechanism.

The spaser is a proposed nanoscale source of optical fields that is being investigated in a number of leading laboratories around the world. Spasers could find a wide range of applications, including nanoscale lithography, fabrication of ultra-fast photonic nano circuits, single-molecule biochemical sensing, and microscopy.

From Nature Photonics:

A spaser is the nanoplasmonic counterpart of a laser, but it (ideally) does not emit photons. It is analogous to the conventional laser, but in a spaser photons are replaced by surface plasmons and the resonant cavity is replaced by a nanoparticle, which supports the plasmonic modes. Similarly to a laser, the energy source for the spasing mechanism is an active (gain) medium that is excited externally. This excitation field may be optical and unrelated to the spaser's operating frequency; for instance, a spaser can operate in the near-infrared but the excitation of the gain medium can be achieved using an ultraviolet pulse. The reason that surface plasmons in a spaser can work analogously to photons in a laser is that their relevant physical properties are the same. First, surface plasmons are bosons: they are vector excitations and have spin 1, just as photons do. Second, surface plasmons are electrically neutral excitations. And third, surface plasmons are the most collective material oscillations known in nature, which implies they are the most harmonic (that is, they interact very weakly with one another). As such, surface plasmons can undergo stimulated emission, accumulating in a single mode in large numbers, which is the physical foundation of both the laser and the spaser.

Study of the quantum mechanical model of the spaser suggests that it should be possible to manufacture a spasing device analogous in function to the MOSFET transistor, but this has not yet been experimentally verified.

== See also ==
- Nanolaser
- Polariton laser
- Surface-enhanced Raman spectroscopy
