= Polariton laser =

A polariton laser is a novel type of laser source that exploits the coherent nature of Bose condensates of exciton-polaritons in semiconductors to achieve ultra-low threshold lasing.

In 1996, Ataç İmamoğlu et al. proposed such a novel type of coherent light source and explained the concept based on an effect closely related to Bose–Einstein condensation of atoms: A large number of bosonic particles (here: polaritons) form a condensate in a macroscopically occupied quantum state via stimulated scattering. The condensate of polaritons finally provides coherent emission of light. Thus, it is a coherent light source that owns a different working mechanism compared to conventional laser devices. Owing to its principle, a polariton-laser promises a more energy-efficient laser operation. The typical semiconductor structure for such a laser consists of an optical microcavity placed between distributed Bragg reflectors.

An early demonstration of polaritonic lasing and a comparison to conventional lasing was achieved in 2003 by H. Deng et al. at Stanford University under optical excitation (Polaritonic condensation was later fully linked to dynamical Bose–Einstein condensation in 2006 by Kasprzak et al.). However, electrical pumping of a polariton laser—crucial for a practical use of polaritonic light sources—was not demonstrated until 2013 when the first and unambiguous demonstration of an electrically pumped polariton-laser was presented by a team of researchers from the University of Michigan and by a team from University of Würzburg together with their international partners using the similar techniques.

At this stage, the electrically driven device operates at very low temperatures around 10 K and needs a magnetic field applied in the Faraday geometry. In 2007, even room temperature operation of an optically pumped polariton laser was demonstrated, promising the development of future electrically pumped polariton lasers for room temperature application.

It is important, and challenging, to distinguish polaritonic lasing from conventional (photonic) lasing, owing to the similar emission characteristics. A crucial element of the success by both teams lies in the hybrid nature of polaritons whose matter component (excitons) exhibits a sensitive response to an external magnetic field. The Michigan team led by Pallab Bhattacharya used a combination of modulation doping of the quantum wells in the active region, to enhance polariton-electron scattering, and an external magnetic field to enhance the polariton-phonon scattering and the exciton -polariton saturation density. With these measures they achieved a comparably low polariton lasing threshold of 12 A/cm^{2} (published in Physical Review Letters in May 2013). The investigations performed by the team in Würzburg, having started with the idea of engineering an electrical device in 2007, led to the desired effect after a few years in cooperation with their international partners from the U.S., Japan, Russia, Singapore, Iceland and Germany. Finally, their studies were complemented by a crucial experiment in a magnetic field: an unambiguous verification of the emission-mode's matter component in the polaritonic laser regime was given, yielding a first-time experimental demonstration of an electrically pumped polariton laser by C. Schneider, A. Rahimi-Iman and co-authors in the team of S. Höfling (published in Nature in May 2013).

On June 5, 2014, Bhattacharya's team succeeded in creating what's believed to be the first polariton laser that is fueled by electric current as opposed to light, and also works at room temperature, rather than far below zero.

== See also ==
- Nanolaser
- Plasmonic laser
