= Relativistic chaos =

Theory in physics

In physics, relativistic chaos is the application of chaos theory to dynamical systems described primarily by general relativity, and also special relativity.

John D. Barrow showed in 1982 that the Einstein field equations exhibit chaotic behaviour and modelled the Mixmaster universe as a dynamical system. Later work showed that relativistic chaos is coordinate invariant.

== See also ==
- Quantum chaos
