= Hans-Jürgen Stöckmann =

German physicist

Hans-Jürgen Stöckmann (8 January 1945 in Göttingen, Lower Saxony, Germany) is a German physicist who works in the area of quantum chaos. He is a professor at the University of Marburg, Germany. He is the son of the physicist Fritz Stöckmann. Stöckmann had studied physics at Heidelberg University and received his doctorate there in 1972. Since 1979 he is a Professor of experimental Physics at the University of Marburg.

== Contributions ==
He had developed a microwave experimental technique for the study of quantum chaos. He had analyzed the behavior of quantum mechanical wave functions using microwaves in different resonator geometries. His technique was revolutionary in the field of experimental Quantum chaos. He has coauthored articles with Eric J. Heller, Marko Robnik, Uzy Smilansky, Fritz Haake, etc. He had written a scholarpedia article titled Microwave billiards and quantum chaos.

== Books ==
He is an author of a well known book on quantum chaos titled Quantum Chaos: An Introduction. Together with Dirk Dubbers, he has coauthored another book titled Quantum Physics: The Bottom-Up Approach.
