= Mark Stockman =

Soviet-born American physicist (1947–2020)

- Stockman in 2014
- Born: Mark Ilyich Shtokman; July 21, 1947; Kharkiv, Ukrainian Soviet Socialist Republic, Soviet Union
- Died: November 11, 2020 (aged 73); Atlanta, Georgia, U.S.
- Citizenship: Soviet Union; United States
- Education: Kyiv State University; Novosibirsk State University; Institute of Nuclear Physics
- Known for: Spaser; Plasmonics
- Spouse: Branislava Mezger
- Children: 1
- Scientific career
- Fields: Physics; Nanophotonics
- Workplaces: Institute of Automation and Electrometry; University at Buffalo; Georgia State University
- Doctoral advisor: Spartak Belyaev; Vladimir Zelelevinsky
- Other academic advisors: Sergey Rautian
- Website: physics.gsu.edu/stockman

Mark Stockman (born Mark Ilyich Shtokman; (Note: Russian: Марк Ильич Штокман) July 21, 1947 – November 11, 2020) was a Soviet-born American physicist. He was a professor of physics and astronomy at Georgia State University. Best known for his contributions to plasmonics, Stockman has co-theorized plasmonic lasers, also known as spasers, in 2003.

== Biography ==
Stockman was born on July 21, 1947, in Kharkiv, Ukrainian Soviet Socialist Republic to a Jewish family with Cantonist roots. His father, Ilya Stockman, was a mining engineer and a World War II veteran. After his father became a faculty member at the Dnepropetrovsk Higher Mining School, his family relocated to Dnepropetrovsk.

Stockman completed his secondary education at the Republican Specialized Physics and Mathematics Boarding School in Kyiv. Following his graduation, he enrolled to Kyiv State University to study physics; he subsequently transferred to Novosibirsk State University, where he obtained his Master of Science in 1970. He completed his PhD at Institute of Nuclear Physics in Novosibirsk in 1974 under the supervision of Spartak Belyaev and Vladimir Zelelevinsky. His doctoral research work concentrated on nuclear physics. During his PhD, he met and married Branislava Mezger and had a son, Dmitriy, in 1978.

No longer being interested in nuclear physics, Stockman transferred to the Institute of Automation and Electrometry in Novosibirsk following his PhD and started working on nonlinear optics as a research scientist under the supervision of Sergey Rautian. He habilitated in 1989, obtaining his DSc. In 1990, with the invitation of Thomas F. George, he left for the United States with his family to take a research position at University at Buffalo in Buffalo, New York. In the meanwhile, he held a visiting position at Washington State University. In 1996, he relocated to Atlanta, Georgia to join the faculty of Georgia State University, where he obtained his full professorship in 2001. Stockman also held visiting positions at Max Planck Institute of Quantum Optics, University of Stuttgart, École normale supérieure Paris-Saclay and ESPCI Paris.

In 2012, Stockman founded the Center for Nano Optics at Georgia State University. He was a fellow member of the American Physical Society, The Optical Society and SPIE. He died on November 11, 2020, in Atlanta.

== Research ==
Stockman's research concentrated in the field of nanoplasmonics; he was described as a pivotal figure in the research field. In 2003, alongside David J. Bergman, he theorized the plasmonic lasers known as "spasers," which involved the stimulated emission of localized surface plasmon via metallic nanoparticles instead of conventional optical cavities. They coined the acronym spaser as "surface plasmon amplification by stimulated emission of radiation." Stockman further developed the theory of spasers for optical amplification and ultrashort pulse generation. His research also focused on plasmonic hotspots in nanostructures and nanofocusing in adiabatic tapers, as well as ultrafast active plasmonics.

== Selected publications ==
- Bergman, D. J.; Stockman, M. I. (2003). "Surface Plasmon Amplification by Stimulated Emission of Radiation: Quantum Generation of Coherent Surface Plasmons in Nanosystems". Phys. Rev. Lett. 90 (2) 027402. Bibcode:2003PhRvL..90b7402B. doi:10.1103/PhysRevLett.90.027402. PMID 12570577.
- Stockman, M. I. (2004). "Nanofocusing of Optical Energy in Tapered Plasmonic Waveguides". Physical Review Letters. 93 (13) 137404. Bibcode:2004PhRvL..93m7404S. doi:10.1103/PhysRevLett.93.137404. PMID 15524758.
- Nordlander, P.; Oubre, C.; Prodan, E.; Li, K.; Stockman, M. I. (2004). "Plasmon Hybridization in Nanoparticle Dimers". Nano Letters. 4 (5): 899–903. Bibcode:2004NanoL...4..899N. doi:10.1021/nl049681c.
- Stockman, Mark I. (2008). "Spasers explained". Nature Photonics. 2 (6): 327–329. Bibcode:2008NaPho...2..327S. doi:10.1038/nphoton.2008.85. ISSN 1749-4885.
- MacDonald, K. F.; Sámson, Z. L.; Stockman, M. I.; Zheludev, N. I. (2009). "Ultrafast active plasmonics". Nature Photonics. 3 (1): 55–58. arXiv:0807.2542. Bibcode:2009NaPho...3...55M. doi:10.1038/nphoton.2008.249. S2CID 2529897.
