= Bender–Dunne polynomials =

In mathematics, Bender–Dunne polynomials are a two-parameter family of sequences of orthogonal polynomials studied by Carl M. Bender and Gerald V. Dunne. They may be defined by the recursion:

$$P_0(x) = 1$$,
$$P_{1}(x) = x$$,

and for $n > 1$:

$$P_n(x) = x P_{n-1}(x) + 16 (n-1) (n-J-1) (n + 2 s -2) P_{n-2}(x)$$

where $J$ and $s$ are arbitrary parameters.
