= Wu–Sprung potential =

Concept in mathematical physics

In mathematical physics, the Wu–Sprung potential, named after Hua Wu and Donald Sprung, is a potential function in one dimension inside a Hamiltonian $H = p^2 + f(x)$ with the potential defined by solving a non-linear integral equation defined by the Bohr–Sommerfeld quantization conditions involving the spectral staircase, the energies $E_n$ and the potential $f(x)$.
$$\oint p \, dq =2 \pi n(E)= 4\int_0^a dx \sqrt{E_n - f(x)}$$
here a is a classical turning point so $E = f(a) = f(-a)$, the quantum energies of the model are the roots of the Riemann Xi function $\xi{\left( \frac{1}{2} + i \sqrt{E_n}\right)} = 0$ and $f(x)=f(-x)$. In general, although Wu and Sprung considered only the smooth part, the potential is defined implicitly by $f^{-1}(x)= \sqrt \pi \frac{d^{1/2}}{dx^{1/2}}N(x)$; with N(x) being the eigenvalue staircase $N(x) = \sum_{n=0}^\infty H(x - E_{n})$ and H(x) is the Heaviside step function.

For the case of the Riemann zeros Wu and Sprung and others have shown that the potential can be written implicitly in terms of the Gamma function and zeroth-order Bessel function.

$$f^{-1} (x)=\frac{2}{\sqrt{4x+1} } +\frac{1}{4\pi } \int_{-\sqrt{x} }^{\sqrt{x}}\frac{dr}{\sqrt{x-r^2} } \left( \frac{\Gamma '}{\Gamma } \left( \frac{1}{4} +\frac{ir}{2} \right) -\ln \pi \right)  -\sum\limits_{n=1}^\infty \frac{\Lambda (n)}{2\sqrt{n} } J_0 \left( \sqrt{x} \ln n\right)$$

and that the density of states of this Hamiltonian is just the Delsarte's formula for the Riemann zeta function and defined semiclassically as $\frac{1}{\sqrt \pi} \frac{d^{1/2}}{dx^{1/2}}f^{-1}(x)= \sum_{n=0}^{\infty}\delta (x-E_{n})$

$$\begin{align}
\sum_{n=0}^{\infty }\delta \left( x-\gamma _{n} \right) + \sum_{n=0}^{\infty }\delta \left( x+\gamma _{n} \right)
={}&
\frac{1}{2\pi } \frac{\zeta }{\zeta } \left( \frac{1}{2} +ix\right) +\frac{1}{2\pi } \frac{\zeta '}{\zeta } \left( \frac{1}{2} -ix\right) -\frac{\ln \pi }{2\pi }  \\[10pt]
&{} +\frac{\Gamma '}{\Gamma } \left( \frac{1}{4} +i\frac{x}{2} \right) \frac{1}{4\pi } +\frac{\Gamma '}{\Gamma } \left( \frac{1}{4} -i\frac{x}{2} \right) \frac{1}{4\pi } +\frac{1}{\pi } \delta \left( x-\frac{i}{2} \right) + \frac{1}{\pi } \delta \left( x + \frac{i}{2} \right)
\end{align}$$

here they have taken the derivative of the Euler product on the critical line $\frac{1}{2}+is$; also they use the Dirichlet generating function $\frac{\zeta ' (s)}{\zeta(s)}= -\sum_{n=1}^{\infty} \Lambda (n) e^{-slnn}$. $\Lambda (n)$ is the Mangoldt function.

The main idea by Wu and Sprung and others is to interpret the density of states as the distributional Delsarte's formula and then use the WKB method to evaluate the imaginary part of the zeros by using quantum mechanics.

Wu and Sprung also showed that the zeta-regularized functional determinant is the Riemann Xi-function $\frac{ \xi(s)}{\xi(0)} = \frac{\det(H-s(1-s)+\frac{1}{4})}{\det(H+\frac{1}{4})}$

The main idea inside this problem is to recover the potential from spectral data as in some inverse spectral problems in this case the spectral data is the Eigenvalue staircase, which is a quantum property of the system, the inverse of the potential then, satisfies an Abel integral equation (fractional calculus) which can be immediately solved to obtain the potential.

== Asymptotics ==
For large x if we take only the smooth part of the eigenvalue staircase $N(E) \sim \frac{\sqrt{E} }{2\pi } \log \left( \frac{\sqrt{E} }{2\pi e} \right)$, then the potential as $|x| \to \infty$ is positive and it is given by the asymptotic expression $f(-x) = f(x) \sim 4\pi^2 e^2 \left( \frac{2\epsilon \sqrt{\pi } x+B}{A(\epsilon )} \right) ^{2 / \epsilon }$ with $A(\epsilon ) = \frac{\Gamma{\left( \frac{3+\epsilon }{2} \right)}}{\Gamma{\left( 1 + \frac{\epsilon }{2} \right)}}$ and $B = A(0)$ in the limit $\epsilon \to 0$. This potential is approximately a Morse potential with $16\pi^{2} e^{8|x|}$

The asymptotic of the energies depend on the quantum number n as $E_n = \frac{4\pi^2 n^2}{W^2(ne^{-1})}$, where W is the Lambert W function.

== See also ==
- Riemann hypothesis § Operator theory
- Quantum chaos § One-dimensional systems and potential
