= Carl Jacob Bender =

Carl Jacob Bender was missionary pioneer to Cameroon.
