= International Journal of Theoretical and Applied Finance =

- Discipline: Finance
- Language: English
- Edited by: M. R. Grasselli

Publication details
- History: 1998-present
- Publisher: World Scientific (Singapore)

Standard abbreviations
- ISO 4: Int. J. Theor. Appl. Finance

Indexing
- ISSN: 0219-0249 (print); 1793-6322 (web)

Links
- Journal homepage

The International Journal of Theoretical and Applied Finance (IJTAF) was founded in 1998 and is published by World Scientific. The journal spans a wide range of topics focussing on the use of quantitative tools in finance, including articles on development and implementation of mathematical models, their industrial usage, and application of modern stochastic methods.

The Editor-in-Chief of IJTAF is Matheus R. Grasselli of McMaster University, Ontario. Before Grasselli assumed this role the Editor-in-Chief was Lane P. Hughston of Goldsmiths, University of London who served in that capacity from 2007 until 2022. Grasselli and Hughston served jointly as co-Editors over the year 2022.

The disciplines and topics covered by IJTAF include:

- Mathematical finance
- Financial engineering
- Applications of modern probability theory and stochastic analysis in finance
- Models for interest rate, equity, foreign exchange, commodity, credit and inflation-linked products
- Portfolio theory and long-term investment
- Applications of stochastic optimization, stochastic control and stochastic filtering in finance
- Computational and numerical methods in finance
- Calibration, stress-testing and institutional implementation of financial models
- Modelling issues arising in regulatory aspects of the financial markets
- Modelling issues arising in emerging markets and new product areas
- Mathematical models for systemic risk in financial markets
- Intersection between insurance and actuarial sciences and finance
- Mathematical models for algorithmic trading, high-frequency trading
- Models for the use and impact of cryptocurrencies, blockchain technology, and decentralized finance
- Financial applications of machine learning, financial data analytics
- Climate finance and sustainability

== Abstracting and indexing ==
The journal is abstracted and indexed in:

- JEL electronic indexes, includes EconList, e-JEL, and JEL on CD
- Social Science Research Network (SSRN)
- Mathematical Reviews
- The CFA Digest
- CSA Risk Abstracts
- International Bibliography of the Social Sciences
- Zentralblatt MATH
- Inspec
