= Exceptional point =

Singularities in the parameter space

In quantum physics, exceptional points are singularities in the parameter space where two or more eigenstates (eigenvalues and eigenvectors) coalesce. These points appear in dissipative systems, which make the Hamiltonian describing the system non-Hermitian.

== Photonics ==
The losses in photonic systems, are a feature used to study non-Hermitian physics. Adding non-Hermiticity (such as dichroism) to photonic systems which present Dirac points transforms these degeneracy points into pairs of exceptional points. This has been demonstrated experimentally in numerous photonic systems such as microcavities and photonic crystals. The first demonstration of exceptional points was made by Woldemar Voigt in 1902 for optical modes in crystals.

== Fidelity and fidelity susceptibility ==
In condensed matter and many-body physics, fidelity is often used to detect quantum phase transitions in parameter space. The definition of fidelity is the inner product of the ground state wave functions of two adjacent points in parameter space, $F=|\langle\psi_0(\lambda)|\psi_0(\lambda+\epsilon)\rangle|^2$, where $\epsilon$ is a small quantity. After series expansion, $F=1-\chi_F\epsilon^2+\mathcal{O}(\epsilon^3)$, the first-order correction term of fidelity is zero, and the coefficient of the second-order correction term is called the fidelity susceptibility. The fidelity susceptibility diverges toward positive infinity as the parameters approach the quantum phase transition point.

$$\lim_{\lambda\to\lambda_{\mathrm{QCP}}}\mathbb{Re}\chi_F=\infty$$

For the exceptional points of non-Hermitian quantum systems, after appropriately generalizing the definition of fidelity,

$$F=\langle\psi_0^L(\lambda)|\psi_0^R(\lambda+\epsilon)\rangle\langle\psi_0^L(\lambda+\epsilon)|\psi_0^R(\lambda)\rangle$$

the real part of the fidelity susceptibility diverges toward negative infinity when the parameters approach the exceptional points.

$$\lim_{\lambda\to\lambda_{\mathrm{EP}}}\mathbb{Re}\chi_F=-\infty$$

For non-Hermitian quantum systems with PT symmetry, fidelity can be used to analyze whether exceptional points are of higher-order. Many numerical methods such as the Lanczos algorithm, Density Matrix Renormalization Group (DMRG), and other tensor network algorithms are relatively easy to calculate only for the ground state, but have many difficulties in computing the excited states. Because fidelity only requires the ground state calculations, this approach allows most numerical methods to analyze non-Hermitian systems without excited states, and find the exceptional point, as well as to determine whether it is a higher-order exceptional point.

== Dirac exceptional points ==
A Dirac exceptional point (Dirac EP) is a type of exceptional point at which the energy bands meet with a linear dispersion resembling a Dirac cone. Unlike conventional exceptional points in parity-time (PT) symmetric systems, which typically separate regions with real and complex energy spectra, a Dirac EP can occur within the PT-unbroken region, so that the energy spectrum remains real on both sides of the exceptional point.

Dirac exceptional points have been experimentally observed in a solid-state quantum system using a nitrogen-vacancy center in diamond. In this experiment, two energy levels were observed to become degenerate at the Dirac EP while remaining real in its vicinity. Quantum-state tomography further showed the coalescence of the corresponding eigenstates, distinguishing the Dirac EP from an ordinary Hermitian degeneracy.

The quantum geometry of a Dirac EP also differs from that of conventional exceptional points. Theoretical studies using fidelity susceptibility have found a strongly anisotropic geometric response: the fidelity susceptibility diverges when the Dirac EP is approached along certain directions in parameter space, while remaining finite or vanishing along a dark direction. This directional dependence has been identified as a characteristic geometric property of Dirac exceptional points.

== See also ==
- Dirac cones
- Non-Hermitian quantum mechanics
