= Lane P. Hughston =

American mathematician (born 1951)

- Born: 24 December 1951 (age 74); Corpus Christi, Texas, USA
- Education: Magdalen College, Oxford
- Known for: Schrödinger–HJW theorem
- Scientific career
- Fields: Mathematical finance; Mathematical physics
- Workplaces: Goldsmiths, University of London; Brunel University London; Imperial College London; King's College London; Lincoln College, Oxford
- Doctoral advisor: Roger Penrose

Lane P. Hughston (born 24 December 1951) is an American mathematician.

== Early life and education ==
Lane P. Hughston was born in Corpus Christi, Texas, and raised in Dallas, Texas, where he attended J. J. Pershing Elementary School, Benjamin Franklin Junior High School, and Hillcrest High School. He is the son of Edward Wallace Hughston and Joan Palmer Hughston.

In 1969 he took first place in the nationwide Westinghouse Science Talent Search. He holds an MA and a DPhil from the University of Oxford, where he was a Rhodes Scholar based at Magdalen College. His doctoral studies in mathematics were carried out under the supervision of Roger Penrose.

== Career ==
After completing his doctorate he held a Junior Research Fellowship at Wolfson College, Oxford and then was Darby Fellow and Tutor in Applied Mathematics at Lincoln College, Oxford.

Later, Hughston worked as a financial engineer at Robert Fleming & Co. Limited, London, and at Merrill Lynch, London, and then as Professor of Mathematics at King's College London, Imperial College London, Brunel University London and, more recently, Goldsmiths, University of London.

He has held visiting appointments at the University of Texas at Austin, King's College London, the Institute for Advanced Study, the Perimeter Institute for Theoretical Physics, and University College London. He has carried out research in general relativity, cosmology, twistor theory, quantum mechanics, quantum information, statistical mechanics, mathematical finance and music theory. Hughston served for sixteen years as Editor-in-Chief at International Journal of Theoretical and Applied Finance over the period 2007 to 2022, the final year being as co-Editor-in-Chief alongside M. R. Grasselli. In 2008, in collaboration with Mark H. A. Davis, he organized the Fifth World Congress of the Bachelier Finance Society.

== See also ==
- Schrödinger–HJW theorem
- Westinghouse Science Talent Search
