= Carl M. Bender =

American mathematician and physicist

- Born: 1943 (age 82–83)
- Education: Harvard University (M.A., Ph.D.); Cornell University (A.B.)
- Known for: Bender–Dunne polynomials Non-Hermitian quantum mechanics PT symmetry
- Awards: Dannie Heineman Prize for Mathematical Physics (2017); Guggenheim Fellowship (2003); Fellows Award, Academy of Science, St. Louis (2002); Fulbright Fellowship (1995)
- Scientific career
- Workplaces: Washington University in St. Louis; Massachusetts Institute of Technology
- Doctoral advisor: Tai Tsun Wu; Sidney Coleman
- Doctoral students: Tom Banks; David J. Griffiths

Carl M. Bender (born 1943) is an American applied mathematician and mathematical physicist. He currently holds the Wilfred R. and Ann Lee Konneker Distinguished Professorship of Physics at Washington University in St. Louis. He also has joint positions as professor of physics at the University of Heidelberg and as visiting professor of applied mathematics and mathematical physics at Imperial College, London.

Bender achieved initial prominence in the sciences for his work on perturbative and nonperturbative methods in quantum field theory. At the turn of the millennium, Bender discovered the importance of parity-time (PT) symmetry in non-Hermitian quantum systems. His work influenced major advances in physics, particularly optics.

== Biography ==
Bender has a storied family history in physics. His father, Alfred Bender, taught physics to Julian Schwinger at Townsend Harris High School. Schwinger wrote of Alfred Bender:

I took my first physics course in High School. That instructor showed unlimited patience in answering my endless questions about atomic physics, after the class period was over. Although I try, I cannot live up to that lofty standard.

In a remarkable coincidence, Alfred's first cousin, Abram Bader, taught physics to Richard Feynman at Far Rockaway High School. Feynman wrote of Bader:

When I was in high school, my physics teacher—whose name was Mr. Bader—called me down one day after physics class and said, 'You look bored; I want to tell you something interesting.' Then he told me something which I found absolutely fascinating, and have, since then, always found fascinating.

Schwinger and Feynman, along with Tomonaga, would go on to share the same Nobel Prize in 1965 for their work in Quantum Electro Dynamics (QED).

Bender received his B.A. in 1964 from Cornell University, where he graduated summa cum laude and with Distinction in All Subjects and was elected to residence in the Telluride House. There, he also became a member of Phi Beta Kappa and Phi Kappa Phi honoraries. He earned his M.A. and Ph.D in physics from Harvard University in 1965 and 1969, respectively, where he trained under physicists Sidney Coleman and Tai-Tsun Wu. He also took many classes from his father's pupil, Julian Schwinger. He was a visiting scholar at the Institute for Advanced Study in 1969–70.

Bender obtained a faculty position in the Massachusetts Institute of Technology Mathematics Department in 1970, where he was assistant and then associate professor. In 1977, he moved to Washington University in St. Louis, where he is the Wilfred R. and Ann Lee Konneker Distinguished Professor of Physics. He has been a scientific consultant for Los Alamos National Laboratory since 1979 and has also held joint and/or visiting positions at Imperial College London, City University of London, King's College London, the Technion, and the University of Heidelberg.

== Teaching ==
In 1976, Bender won the MIT Graduate Student Council Teaching Award, and in 1983 he won the Gargoyle Award for teaching undergraduates at Washington University. Bender coached the Washington University Putnam mathematics competition team, which had many top-five performances under his leadership. He also chaired the Arthur Holly Compton Fellowship in the Physical Sciences and Mathematics selection committee, which distributes over $1.2 million in scholarships to prospective undergraduates each year. Bender has often given public talks on a number of areas including quantum mechanics, quantum field theory, black holes, global warming, the rumbling of thunder, and theoretical physics. He is an expert on lower-dimensional quantum field theories, which he refers to as "country-style quantum physics".

== Research ==
Bender has published over 340 articles on physics, mathematics, and geysers. Bender initially focused his research on approximation methods for theoretical physics. He made numerous advances on these topics, including the elucidation of divergences due to Bender-Wu singularities, the development of novel perturbative and nonperturbative techniques, and pioneering the use of the delta expansion. His book with Steven Orszag on asymptotic methods and perturbation theory, Advanced Mathematical Methods for Scientists and Engineers, was once described by physicist Nigel Goldenfeld as "simply the best book in applied mathematics". In 1998, he and his graduate student Stefan Boettcher discovered the importance of parity-time (PT) symmetry in non-Hermitian quantum theory, which led to advances in many applied disciplines.

== Awards ==
Bender's career has been marked by a number of major academic achievements and honors. He won a Guggenheim Fellowship in 2003 for his work in lower-dimensional quantum field theory. In 1978 he was elected as a Fellow of the American Physical Society, and he is also a fellow of the UK Institute of Physics. In 2007 Professor Bender held the Ulam Fellowship at the Center for Nonlinear Studies at Los Alamos National Laboratory. He received the Fulbright Fellowship and Lady Davis Fellowship (visiting professor) in 1995.

In 2017, Professor Bender won one of the highest honors in mathematical physics, the Dannie Heineman Prize for Mathematical Physics, which is jointly awarded by the American Physical Society and the American Institute of Physics. The award citation stated that he won "for developing the theory of PT symmetry in quantum systems and sustained seminal contributions that have generated profound and creative new mathematics, impacted broad areas of experimental physics, and inspired generations of mathematical physicists."

== Works ==
- Carl M. Bender, Steven Orszag, Advanced Mathematical Methods for Scientists and Engineers: Asymptotic Methods and Perturbation Theory, Springer, 1999, ISBN 978-0-387-98931-0
- Carl M Bender and Stefan Boettcher, "Real Spectra in non-Hermitian Hamiltonians Having PT Symmetry," Physical Review Letters 80, 5243 (1998).
- Carl M Bender, "Making Sense of Non-Hermitian Hamiltonians," Reports on Progress in Physics 70, 947 (2007).
- Carl M Bender, PT Symmetry: In Quantum and Classical Physics, World Scientific Publishing Company, 2018, ISBN 978-1-78634-595-0
