= Institute of Automation and Electrometry =

Research institute of Novosibirsk, Russia

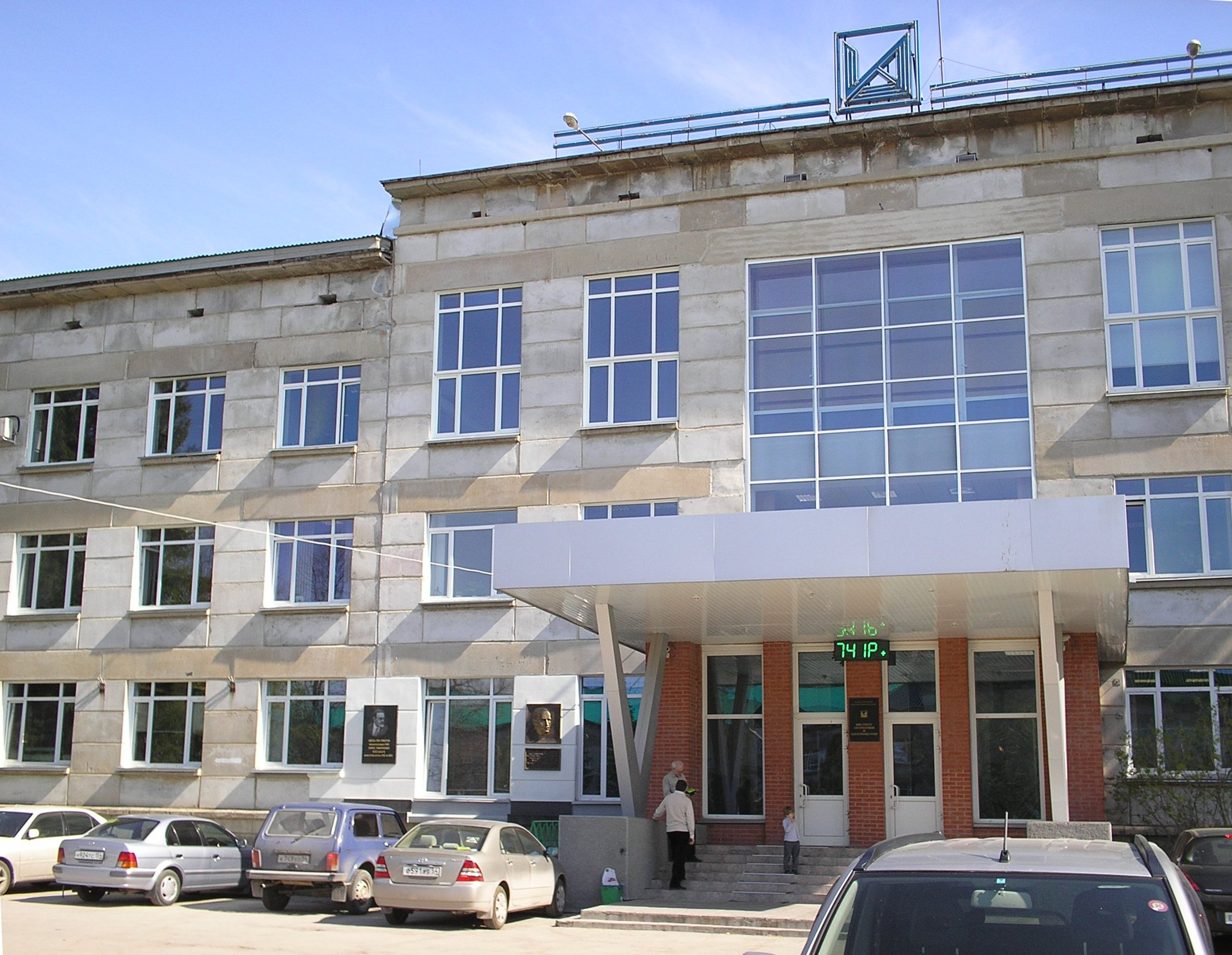
- Founder: Boris Karandeyev
- Established: 1957
- Director: Sergey Babin
- Owner: Siberian Branch of RAS
- Address: Koptyug Prospekt 1, Novosibirsk, 630090, Russia
- Location: Novosibirsk, Russia
- Website: www.iae.nsk.su

Institute of Automation and Electrometry of the Siberian Branch of the RAS (Russian: Институт автоматики и электрометрии СО РАН) is a research institute of Novosibirsk, Russia. It was founded in 1957.

The institute is among the first research institutes organized in Akademgorodok.

== Scientific activity ==
Initially, the scientific activity of the Institute was associated with automatic measuring devices and systems for collection of information and data processing. The institute conducts research in the field of optics, spectroscopy, condensed matter physics, it is exploring degenerate Bose–Einstein condensates of rarefied gases. The scientific organization develops precision optical technology, computing systems etc.

== Collaboration ==
The Institute cooperates with Rzhanov Institute of Semiconductor Physics, Institute of Laser Physics and Novosibirsk State University in the field of physics of ultracold atoms.

== Leaders ==
- Boris Karandeyev (1957–1967), the founder and the first director of the institute.
- Yuri Nesterikhin (1967–1987)
- Pyotr Tverdokhlebov (1987–1993)
- Semyon Vaskov (1993–2002)
- Anatoly Shalagin (2002–2017)
- Sergey Babin (since 2018)
