= Gaussian ensemble =

Random matrix with gaussian entries

In random matrix theory, the Gaussian ensembles are specific probability distributions over self-adjoint matrices whose entries are independently sampled from the gaussian distribution. They are among the most-commonly studied matrix ensembles, fundamental to both mathematics and physics. The three main examples are the Gaussian orthogonal (GOE), unitary (GUE), and symplectic (GSE) ensembles. These are classified by the Dyson index β, which takes values 1, 2, and 4 respectively, counting the number of real components per matrix element (1 for real elements, 2 for complex elements, 4 for quaternions). The index can be extended to take any real positive value.

The gaussian ensembles are also called the Wigner ensembles, or the Hermite ensembles.

== Definitions ==
=== Conventions ===
There are many conventions for defining the Gaussian ensembles. In this article, we specify exactly one of them.

In all definitions, the Gaussian ensemble have zero expectation.

- $\beta$: a positive real number. Called the Dyson index. The cases of $\beta = 1, 2, 4$ are special.
- $N$: the side-length of a matrix. Always a positive integer.
- $W_{N}$: a matrix sampled from a Gaussian ensemble with size $N \times N$. The letter $W$ stands for "Wigner".
- $M^*$: the adjoint of a matrix. We assume $W_N = W_N^*$ (self-adjoint) when $W_{N}$ is sampled from a gaussian ensemble.
  - If $M$ is real, then $M^*$ is its transpose.
  - If $M$ is complex or quaternionic, then $M^*$ is its conjugate transpose.
- $\lambda_1, \dots, \lambda_N$: the eigenvalues of the matrix, which are all real, since the matrices are always assumed to be self-adjoint.
- $\sigma_{d}^2$: the variance of on-diagonal matrix entries. We assume that for each $N$, all on-diagonal matrix entries have the same variance. It is always defined as $\mathbb E[|W_{N, }|^2]$.
- $\sigma_{od}^2$: the variance of off-diagonal matrix entries. We assume that for each $N$, all off-diagonal matrix entries have the same variance. It is always defined as $\mathbb E[|W_{N, ij}|^2]$ where $i \neq j$.
  - For a complex number, $|a + bi|^2 = a^2 + b^2$.
  - For a quaternion, $|a + bi + cj + dk|^2 = a^2 + b^2 + c^2 + d^2$.
- $Z$: the partition function.

Summary of convention in the page
Name	GOE(N)	GUE(N)	GSE(N)	GβE(N)
Full name	Gaussian orthogonal ensemble	Gaussian unitary ensemble	Gaussian symplectic ensemble	Gaussian beta ensemble
$\beta$	1	2	4	β
$\sigma_{d}^2$	2	1	1/2	2/β
$\sigma_{od}^2$	1	1	1	1
matrix density	$\frac{1}{Z} e^{- \frac{1}{4} \mathrm{Tr} W_N^2}$	$\frac{1}{Z} e^{- \frac{1}{2} \mathrm{Tr} W_N^2}$	$\frac{1}{Z} e^{- \mathrm{Tr} W_N^2}$	$\frac{1}{Z} e^{- \frac{1}{4}\beta \mathrm{Tr} W_N^2}$
$Z$	$2^{\frac{1}{4}N(N+3)}\pi^{\frac{1}{4}N(N+1)}$	$2^{\frac{1}{2}N}\pi^{\frac{1}{2}N^{2}}$	$2^{-N(N-1)}\pi^{\frac{1}{2}N(2N-1)}$	$2^{\frac 12 N}\left(\frac{2\pi}{\beta}\right)^{\frac 12 N + \frac 14 \beta N (N-1)}$

When referring to the main reference works, it is necessary to translate the formulas from them, since each convention leads to different constant scaling factors for the formulas.

Conventions in reference works
Name	$\sigma_{d}^2$	$\sigma_{od}^2$
Wikipedia (this page)	2/β	1
(Deift 2000) (β = 2 only)	1/2	1/2
(Mehta 2004)	1/β	1/2
(Anderson, Guionnet & Zeitouni 2010)	2/β	1
(Forrester 2010) for β = 1, 2, 4	1/β	1/2
(Forrester 2010) for β ≠ 1, 2, 4	1	β/2
(Tao 2012) (β = 2 only)	1	1
(Mingo & Speicher 2017) (β = 2 only)	1/N	1/N
(Livan, Novaes & Vivo 2018)	1	β/2
(Potters & Bouchaud 2020)	$\frac{2\sigma^2}{\beta N}$	$\frac{\sigma^2}{N}$

There are equivalent definitions for the GβE(N) ensembles, given below.

=== By sampling ===
For all $\beta = 1, 2, 4$ cases, the GβE(N) ensemble is defined by how it is sampled:

- Sample a gaussian matrix $X_N$, such that all its entries are IID sampled from the corresponding standard normal distribution.
  - If $\beta = 1$, then $X_{N, ij} \sim \mathcal N(0, 1)$.
  - If $\beta = 2$, then $X_{N, ij} \sim \mathcal N(0, 1/2) + i\mathcal N(0, 1/2)$.
  - If $\beta = 4$, then $X_{N, ij} \sim \mathcal N(0, 1/4) + i\mathcal N(0, 1/4) + j\mathcal N(0, 1/4) + k\mathcal N(0, 1/4)$.
- Let $W_N = \frac{1}{\sqrt 2}(X + X^*)$.

=== By density ===
For all $\beta = 1, 2, 4$ cases, the GβE(N) ensemble is defined with density function
$$\rho(W_N) = \frac{1}{Z} e^{- \frac{\beta}{4}\sum_{i = 1}^N W_{N, ii}^2 - \frac \beta 2 \sum_{1 \leq i < j \leq N} |W_{N, ij}|^2} = \frac{1}{Z} e^{- \frac{\beta}{4} \mathrm{Tr} W_N^2}$$
where the partition function is $Z = 2^{\frac 12 N}\left(\frac{2\pi}{\beta}\right)^{\frac 12 N + \frac 14 \beta N (N-1)}$.

The Gaussian orthogonal ensemble GOE(N) is defined as the probability distribution over $N \times N$ symmetric matrices with density function
$$\rho(W_N) = \frac{1}{Z} e^{- \frac{1}{4}\sum_{i = 1}^N W_{N, ii}^2 - \frac 12 \sum_{1 \leq i < j \leq N} W_{N, ij}^2} = \frac{1}{Z} e^{- \frac{1}{4} \mathrm{Tr} W_N^2}$$
where the partition function is $Z = 2^{\frac{1}{4}N(N+3)}\pi^{\frac{1}{4}N(N+1)}$.

Explicitly, since there are only $\frac 12 N(N+1)$ degrees of freedom, the parameterization is as follows:
$$\rho(W_N) \prod_{1 \leq i \leq j \leq N} dW_{N, ij}$$
where we pick the upper diagonal entries $\{W_{ij}\}_{1 \leq i \leq j \leq N}$ as the degrees of freedom.

The Gaussian unitary ensemble GUE(N) is defined as the probability distribution over $N \times N$ Hermitian matrices with density function
$$\rho(W_N)
= \frac{1}{Z}
e^{-\frac{1}{2}\sum_{i = 1}^N W_{N, ii}^2
- \sum_{1 \leq i < j \leq N} |W_{N, ij}|^2}
= \frac{1}{Z} e^{-\frac{1}{2}\mathrm{Tr}\,W_N^2}.$$
where the partition function is $Z = 2^{\frac{1}{2}N}\pi^{\frac{1}{2}N^{2}}$.

Explicitly, since there are only $N^{2}$ degrees of freedom, the parameterization is as follows:
$$\rho(W_N)\,
\prod_{i = 1}^{N} dW_{N, ii}\;
\prod_{1 \leq i < j \leq N}
d(\mathrm{Re}\,W_{N, ij})\,
d(\mathrm{Im}\,W_{N, ij})$$
where we pick the upper diagonal entries $\{W_{N, ii}\}_{1 \leq i \leq N} \cup \{\mathrm{Re}\,W_{N, ij},\, \mathrm{Im}\,W_{N, ij}\}_{1 \leq i < j \leq N}$ as the degrees of freedom.

The Gaussian symplectic ensemble GSE(N) is defined as the probability distribution over $N \times N$ self‑adjoint quaternionic matrices with density function
$$\rho(W_N)
= \frac{1}{Z}
e^{- \sum_{i = 1}^N W_{N, ii}^2
- 2 \sum_{1 \leq i < j \leq N} |W_{N, ij}|^2}
= \frac{1}{Z} e^{-\mathrm{Tr}\,W_N^2}.$$
where the partition function is $Z = 2^{-N(N-1)}\pi^{\frac{1}{2}N(2N-1)}$.

Explicitly, since there are only $N(2N - 1)$ degrees of freedom, the parameterization is as follows:
$$\rho(W_N)\,
\prod_{i = 1}^{N} dW_{N, ii}\;
\prod_{1 \leq i < j \leq N}
\prod_{a = 0}^{3} dW_{N, ij}^{(a)}$$
where we write $W_{N, ij} = W_{N, ij}^{(0)} + i\,W_{N, ij}^{(1)} + j\,W_{N, ij}^{(2)} + k\,W_{N, ij}^{(3)}$ and pick the upper diagonal entries $\{W_{N, ii}\}_{1 \leq i \leq N} \cup \{W_{N, ij}^{(a)}\}_{1 \leq i < j \leq N,\;0 \leq a \leq 3}$ as the degrees of freedom.

=== By invariance ===
For all $\beta = 1, 2, 4$ cases, the GβE(N) ensemble is uniquely characterized (up to affine transform) by its symmetries, or invariance under appropriate transformations.

For GOE, consider a probability distribution over $N \times N$ symmetric matrices satisfying the following properties:

- Invariance under orthogonal transformation: For any fixed (not random) $N \times N$ orthogonal matrix $O$, let $M$ be a random sample from the distribution. Then $OMO^T$ has the same distribution as $M$.
- Independence: The entries $\{M_{ij}\}_{1 \leq i \leq j \leq N}$ are independently distributed.

For GUE, consider a probability distribution over $N \times N$ Hermitian matrices satisfying the following properties:

- Invariance under unitary transformation: For any fixed (not random) $N \times N$ unitary matrix $U$, let $M$ be a random sample from the distribution. Then $UMU^*$ has the same distribution as $M$.
- Independence: The entries $\{M_{ij}\}_{1 \leq i \leq j \leq N}$ are independently distributed.

For GSE, consider a probability distribution over $N \times N$ self-adjoint quaternionic matrices satisfying the following properties:

- Invariance under symplectic transformation: For any fixed (not random) $N \times N$ symplectic matrix $S$, let $M$ be a random sample from the distribution. Then $SMS^*$ has the same distribution as $M$.
- Independence: The entries $\{M_{ij}\}_{1 \leq i \leq j \leq N}$ are independently distributed.

In all 3 cases, these conditions force the distribution to have the form $\rho(M) = \frac 1Z e^{- a \operatorname{Tr}(M^2) + b \operatorname{Tr}(M)}$, where $a > 0$ and $b, Z \in \R$. Thus, with the further specification of $\frac 1N \mathbb E[\operatorname{Tr}(M)] = 0, \frac{1}{N^2} \mathbb E[\operatorname{Tr}(M^2)] = 1 + \frac{2/\beta - 1}{N}$, we recover the GOE, GUE, GSE. Notably, if mere invariance is demanded, then any spectral distribution can be produced by multiplying with a function of form $f(\operatorname{Tr}(X), \operatorname{Tr}(X^2), \operatorname{Tr}(X^3), \dots)$.

More succinctly stated, each of GOE, GUE, GSE is uniquely specified by invariance, independence, the mean, and the variance.

=== By spectral distribution ===
For all $\beta = 1, 2, 4$ cases, the GβE(N) ensemble is defined as the ensemble obtained by $ADA^*$, where

- $D = \operatorname{diag}(\lambda_1, \dots, \lambda_N)$ is a diagonal real matrix with its entries sampled according to the spectral density, defined below;
- $A$ is an orthogonal/unitary/symplectic matrix sampled uniformly, that is, from the normalized Haar measure of the orthogonal/unitary/symplectic group.

In this way, the GβE(N) ensemble may be defined after the spectral density is defined first, so that any method to motivate the spectral density then motivates the GβE(N) ensemble, and vice versa.

=== By maximal entropy ===
For all $\beta = 1, 2, 4$ cases, the GβE(N) ensemble is uniquely characterized as the absolutely continuous probability distribution $\rho$ over $N\times N$ real/complex/quaternionic symmetric/orthogonal/symplectic matrices that maximizes entropy $\mathbb E_{M \sim \rho}[- \ln \rho(M)]$, under the constraint of $\frac{1}{N^2}\mathbb E_{M \sim \rho}[\operatorname{Tr}(M^2)] = 1 + \frac{2/\beta - 1}{N}$.

== Spectral density ==
For eigenvalues $\lambda_{1}, \dots, \lambda_{N}$ the joint density of GβE(N) is
$$\rho_{\beta, N}(\lambda_1, \dots, \lambda_N) = \frac{1}{Z_{\beta, N}} e^{-\frac \beta 4 \sum_{i=1}^N \lambda_i^2} \prod_{1 \leq i < j \leq N} |\lambda_i - \lambda_j|^\beta = \frac{1}{Z_{\beta, N}} e^{-\frac{\beta}{4}\|\lambda\|_{2}^{2}} |\Delta_{N}(\lambda)|^{\beta}$$
where $\Delta_{N}$ is the Vandermonde determinant, and the partition function $Z_{\beta, N}$ is explicitly evaluated as a Selberg integral:
$$\begin{aligned}
Z_{\beta, N} &= \int_{\R^N} e^{-\frac \beta 4 \sum_{i=1}^N \lambda_i^2} \prod_{1 \leq i < j \leq N} |\lambda_i - \lambda_j|^\beta d\lambda\\
&= (2\pi)^{\frac N2} \left(\frac 2\beta\right)^{\frac 12N + \frac  14 \beta N(N-1)} \prod_{j=1}^N \frac{\Gamma\left(1 + j\frac \beta 2\right)}{\Gamma\left(1 + \frac \beta 2\right)}
\end{aligned}$$
where $\Gamma$ is the Euler Gamma function. The expression is particularly simple when $\beta = 2$, where we have a superfactorial:
$$Z_{2, N} = (2\pi)^{\frac N2}\prod_{j=1}^N j!$$

=== Determinantal point process ===
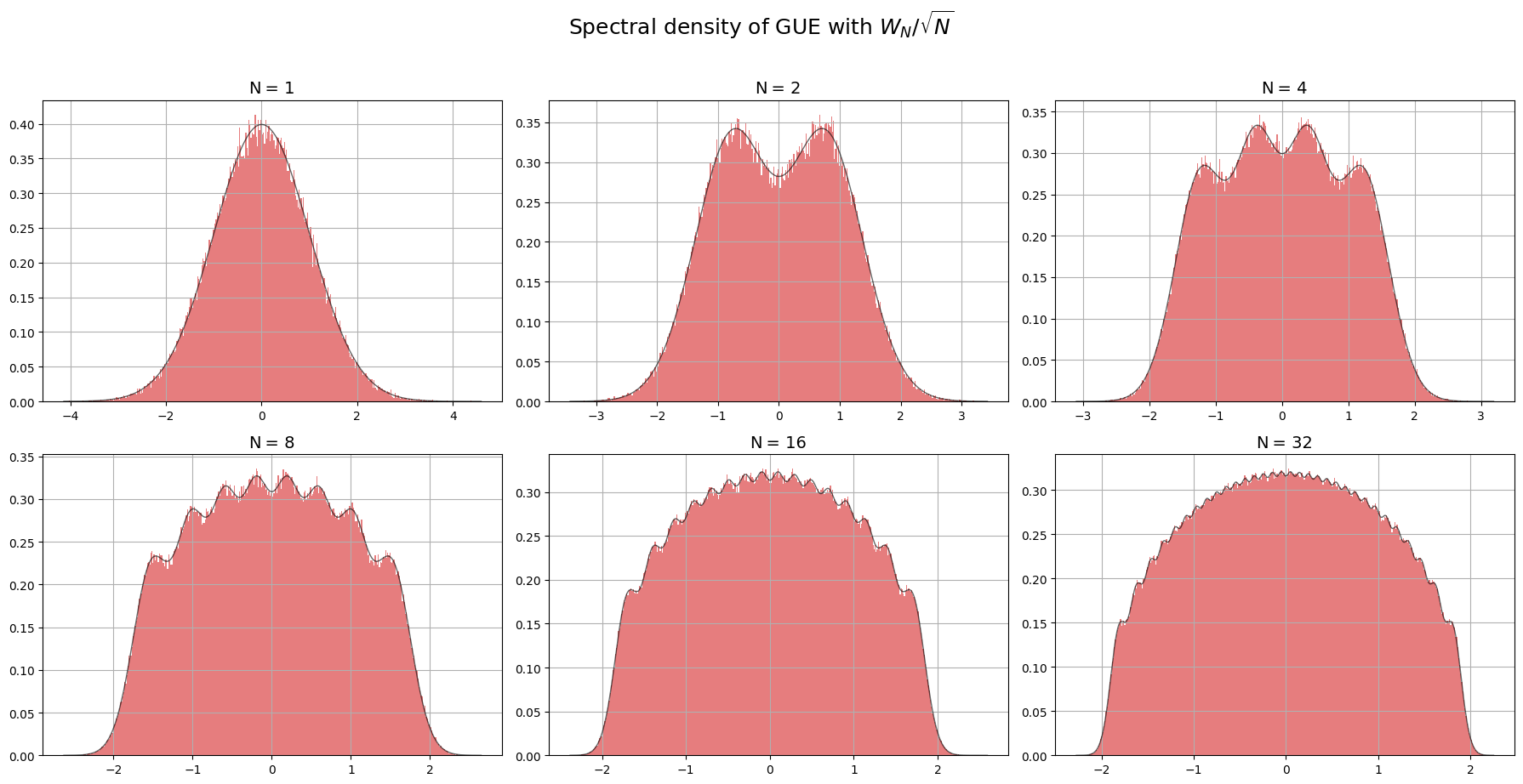
Histogram of the empirical spectral density of $\frac 1\sqrt N W_N$ for $2^0, \dots, 2^5$, obtained by averaging over $10^5$ samples of the matrix, compared with the theoretical prediction of $\sqrt N \rho(\sqrt N x)$.

Define functions $\psi_n(x) := \frac{e^{-\frac 14 x^2}}{\sqrt{n!\sqrt{2\pi}}} \operatorname{He}_n(x)$, where $\operatorname{He}$ is the probabilist's Hermite polynomial. These are the wavefunction states of the quantum harmonic oscillator.

The spectrum of GUE(N) is a determinantal point process with kernel $K_N(x, x') := \sum_{n=0}^{N-1} \psi_n(x) \psi_n(x')$, and by the Christoffel–Darboux formula,
$$K_N(x, x') = \frac{e^{-\frac{1}{4}\left(x^2+x^{\prime 2}\right)}}{(N-1)!\sqrt{2 \pi}} \frac{\operatorname{He}_N(x) \operatorname{He}_{N-1}\left(x^{\prime}\right)-\operatorname{He}_{N-1}(x) \operatorname{He}_N\left(x^{\prime}\right)}{x-x^{\prime}}$$
Using the confluent form of Christoffel–Darboux and the three-term recurrence of Hermite polynomials, the spectral density of GUE(N) for finite values of $N$:
$$\begin{aligned}
\rho(x) &= \frac 1N K_N(x,x)  \\
&= \frac{1}{N\sqrt{2\pi}} e^{-\frac 12 x^2} \sum_{n = 0}^{N-1} \frac{1}{n!} \operatorname{He}_n(x)^2 \\
&= \frac{e^{-x^2 / 2}}{\sqrt{2 \pi}N!}\left(\operatorname{He}_{N}(x)^2 - \operatorname{He}_{N+1}(x) \operatorname{He}_{N-1}(x)\right)
\end{aligned}$$
The spectral distribution of $\beta = 1, 4$ can also be written as a quaternionic determinantal point process involving skew-orthogonal polynomials.

=== Tridiagonalization ===
For all $\beta = 1, 2, 4$ cases, given a sampled matrix $W_N$ from the GβE(N) ensemble, we can perform a Householder transformation tridiagonalization on it to obtain a tridiagonal matrix $T_{\beta, N}$, which has the same distribution as
$$\sqrt{\frac 1\beta}\begin{bmatrix}
a_N\sqrt2 & b_{N-1} & 0 & \cdots & 0 \\
b_{N-1} & a_{N-1}\sqrt2 & b_{N-2} & \ddots & \vdots \\
0 & b_{N-2} & \ddots & \ddots & 0 \\
\vdots & \ddots & \ddots & a_{2}\sqrt2 & b_1 \\
0 & \cdots & 0 & b_1 & a_1 \sqrt2
\end{bmatrix}$$
where each $a_{1}, \dots, a_{N} \sim \mathcal N(0, 1)$ is gaussian-distributed, and each $b_i \sim \chi_{i\beta }$ is chi-distributed, and all $a_{1}, \dots, a_{N}, b_{1}, \dots, b_{N-1}$ are independent. The $\beta = 1$ case was first noted in 1984, and the general case was noted in 2002. Like how the Laplace differential operator can be discretized to the Laplacian matrix, this tridiagonal form of the gaussian ensemble allows a reinterpretation of the gaussian ensembles as an ensemble over not matrices, but over differential operators, specifically, a "stochastic Airy operator". This leads more generally to the study of random matrices as stochastic operators.

Computationally, this allows efficient sampling of eigenvalues, from $O(N^3)$ on the full matrix, to just $O(N^2)$ on the tridiagonal matrix. If one only requires a histogram of the eigenvalues with $m$ bins, the time can be further decreased to $O(Nm)$, by using the Sturm sequences. Theoretically, this definition allows extension to all $\beta > 0$ cases, leading to the gaussian beta ensembles, and "anti-symmetric" gaussian beta ensembles.

Relatedly, let $X_N$ be a $N\times N$ matrix, with all entries IID sampled from the corresponding standard normal distribution – for example, if $\beta = 2$, then $X_{N, ij} \sim \mathcal N(0, 1/2) + i\mathcal N(0, 1/2)$. Then applying repeated Housholder transform on only the left side of a results in $R_N = H_1 \dots H_N X_N$, where each $H_i$ is a Householder matrix, and $R_N$ is an upper triangular matrix with independent entries, such that each $\sqrt{\beta}R_{N, ii} \sim \chi_{N+1-i}$ for $1 \leq i \leq N$, and each $R_{N, ij} \sim \mathcal N(0, 1/\beta)^{\otimes \beta}$ for $1 \leq i < j \leq N$.

=== Global law ===
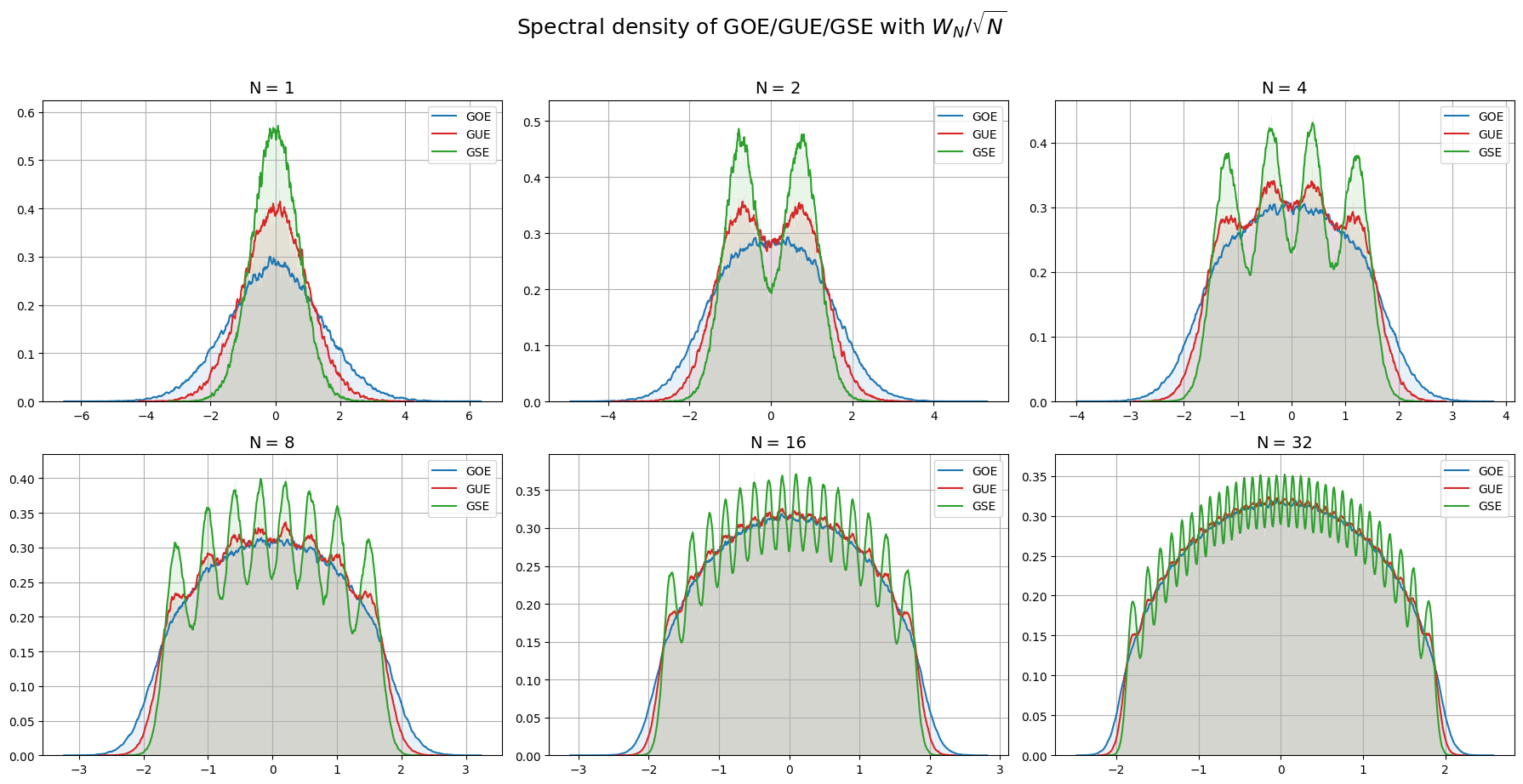
Spectral density of GOE/GUE/GSE for $N = 2^{0}, 2^{1}, \dots, 2^{5}$. Each distribution is normalized to converge to the semicircle with radius 2.

The Wigner semicircle law states that the empirical eigenvalue distribution of $\frac{1}{\sqrt{N}}W_N$ converges in distribution to the Wigner semicircle distribution with radius 2. That is, the distribution on $[-2, +2]$ with probability density function
$$\rho_{sc}(x)=\frac{\sqrt{4-x^2}}{2\pi}$$

The requirement that the matrix ensemble to be a gaussian ensemble is too strong for the Wigner semicircle law. Indeed, the theorem applies generally for much more generic matrix ensembles.

=== As Coulomb gas ===
The joint density $\rho_{\beta,N}$ can be written as a Gibbs measure:
$$\rho_{\beta,N} = \frac{1}{Z_{\beta, N}^{\text{CG}}}e^{-\beta E_N}$$
with the energy function (also called the Hamiltonian) $E_N = \frac 14 \sum_{i=1}^N \lambda_i^2 - \sum_{1 \leq i < j \leq N} \ln |\lambda_i - \lambda_j|$. This can be interpreted physically as a Boltzmann distribution of a physical system consisting of $N$ identical unit electric charges constrained to move on the real line, repelling each other via the two-dimensional Coulomb potential $-\ln |x - y|$, while being attracted to the origin via a quadratic potential $\frac 14 x^2$. This is the Coulomb gas model for the eigenvalues.

In the macroscopic limit, one rescales $\lambda_i=N^{1/2}x_i$ and defines the empirical measure $\mu_N=N^{-1}\sum_{i=1}^N\delta_{x_i}$, obtaining $E_N \approx \frac 12 N^2 \left(\mathcal E[\mu] + \frac 12 \ln N \right)$, where the mean-field functional
$$\mathcal E[\mu]=\frac12\int_\R x^2 \mu(dx)-\iint_{\R^2} \ln|x-y| \mu(dx) \mu(dy)$$
yields the leading order $N^2$ term in $\ln Z_{\beta,N}$, termed the Coulomb gas free energy. The Coulomb gas free energy is minimized by the Wigner semicircle law $d\mu_{sc}(x)=(2\pi)^{-1}\sqrt{4-x^2}1_{\{|x|\le2\}}dx$, which gives the limiting eigenvalue density.

Alternatively, suppose that there exists a $\rho_b$, such that the quadratic electric potential can be recreated (up to an additive constant) via
$$\int_{-2\sqrt{ N}}^{2\sqrt{ N}} -\ln |x-y| \rho_b(y) d y=\frac{1}{4}x^2 + C, \quad x \in[-2\sqrt{N}, 2\sqrt{N}] .$$
Then, imposing a fixed background negative electric charge of density $|\rho_b(y)|$ exactly cancels out the electric repulsion between the freely moving positive charges. Such a function does exist: $\rho_b(y) = -\frac{\sqrt{4N - y^2}}{2N\pi}$, which can be found by solving an integral equation. This indicates that the Wigner semicircle distribution is the equilibrium distribution.

Gaussian fluctuations about $\mu_{sc}$ obtained by expanding $E_N$ to second order produce the sine kernel in the bulk and the Airy kernel at the soft edge after proper rescaling.

=== Extreme value ===
The largest eigenvalue for GβE(N) follows the Tracy–Widom distribution after proper translation and scaling. It can be efficiently sampled by the shift-invert Lanczos algorithm on the $10 n^{1/3} \times 10 n^{1/3}$ upper left corner of the tridiagonal matrix form.

=== Level spacings ===
From ordered eigenvalues $\lambda_{1} < \dots < \lambda_{n} < \lambda_{n+1} < \dots < \lambda_{N}$, define normalized spacings $s_n = \frac{\lambda_{n+1} - \lambda_{n}}{\langle s \rangle}$ with mean spacing $\langle s \rangle$. This normalizes the spacings by:
$$\int_{0}^{\infty} p_{\beta}(s) \, ds = 1,\qquad \int_{0}^{\infty} s\, p_{\beta}(s) \, ds = 1,\qquad \beta = 1, 2, 4.$$
With this, the approximate spacing distributions are
$$p_{\beta}(s) = \begin{cases}
\frac{\pi}{2} s \exp\left(-\frac{\pi}{4} s^{2}\right) & \beta = 1 \\
\frac{32}{\pi^{2}} s^{2} \exp\left(-\frac{4}{\pi} s^{2}\right) & \beta = 2 \\
\frac{2^{18}}{3^{6}\pi^{3}} s^{4} \exp\left(-\frac{64}{9\pi} s^{2}\right) & \beta = 4 \\
\end{cases}$$

=== Moments ===
For GOE(N), its moment generating function is $\mathbb E\left[e^{\operatorname{Tr}(V W_{N})}\right] = e^{\frac{1}{4}\|V + V^{\text{T}}\|_{F}^{2}}$, where $\|\cdot\|_{F}$ is the Frobenius norm.

== Rotationally symmetric ensemble ==
The GUE(N) ensemble can be understood as a particularly representative member of the general family of rotationally symmetric ensembles over Hermitian matrices. The general theory of rotationally symmetric ensembles has allowed researchers to prove some universality results.

== Physics ==
=== The Wigner surmise ===
The Gaussian ensemble was first motivated in theoretical physics. In the 1940s, Eugene Wigner studied the irregular spacings of slow-neutron resonances in heavy nuclei. Working with the few dozen levels then available, he noticed a pronounced repulsion between neighbouring lines.

In 1951, he modelled the Hamiltonian of a compound-nucleus in a minimal way. He noted that by symmetry considerations, it must be a real symmetric operator, so he modelled it as a random sample from the GOE(N). He solved the 2×2 case and found the two-level spacing law $P(s)=\frac{\pi}{2}s e^{-\pi s^{2}/4}$, which matched well with the data. He disseminated his guess ("the Wigner surmise") during a conference on Neutron Physics by Time-of-Flight in 1956:

Perhaps I am now too courageous when I try to guess the distribution of the distances between successive levels (of energies of heavy nuclei). Theoretically, the situation is quite simple if one attacks the problem in a simpleminded fashion. The question is simply what are the distances of the characteristic values of a symmetric matrix with random coefficients.

— Eugene Wigner, Results and theory of resonance absorption

Freeman Dyson stated the project as a statistical theory of nuclear energy levels, to be contrasted with precise calculations based on an analytic model of the nucleus. He argued that a statistical theory is necessary, because the energy levels then measured were on the order of millions, and for such a high order, precise calculations was simply impossible. The idea was different from the then-understood form of statistical mechanics, for instead of having a system with precisely stated dynamical laws, with too many particles interacting under it, thus the particles need to be treated statistically, he would model the dynamical laws themselves as unknown, and thus treated statistically.

=== Threefold Way ===
In 1962, Dyson proposed the "Threefold Way" to motivate the three ensembles, by showing that in 3 fields (group representation, quantum mechanics, random matrix theory), there is a 3-fold disjunction, which he traced back to the Frobenius theorem stating that there are only 3 real division algebras: the real, the complex, and the quaternionic. A random matrix representing a Hamiltonian $H$ can be classified by an anti-unitary operator $T$ that describes time-reversal symmetry. The classification depends on whether $T$ exists present and, if so, the value of $T^2$. Each symmetry class produces a constraint on the possible form of $H$, and the corresponding gaussian ensemble can then be motivated as a maximal entropy distribution, as described previously.

Dyson's Threefold Way
Symmetry	Matrix basis where $H$ is...	Group representation	Ensemble
$T^2 = +1$ (e.g., integer spin, no strong spin–orbit interaction)	real symmetric	real	GOE
No $T$ (e.g., presence of a magnetic field, magnetic impurities, chiral gauge potential)	complex Hermitian	complex	GUE
$T^2 = -1$ (e.g., half-integer spin with spin-orbit interaction)	quaternionic self-adjoint (symplectic)	pseudoreal	GSE

If $T^2=+1$, the Hamiltonian $H$ must be real symmetric. This typically occurs in systems with no magnetic field and either spinless particles or integer spin particles with negligible spin–orbit interaction. This occurs in level spacing distribution in nuclear compound states, the original motivation for Wigner.

If $T$ does not exist, then $H$ is only required to be Hermitian. Time-reversal symmetry can be broken by a homogeneous magnetic field, random magnetic fluxes, or spin-selective lasers. In these cases, the off-diagonal matrix elements acquire independent complex phases.

- Chaotic microwave cavities with a ferrite: Adding a strong axial magnetic field causes the level statistics to transition continuously from GOE to GUE, which was a confirmation of the BGS conjecture.
- Quantum Hall effect: The physics of quantum Hall edge states and Landau levels is modelled by the GUE due to the strong perpendicular magnetic field breaking time-reversal symmetry.
- Anderson localization in 3-D: Applying an Aharonov–Bohm flux can drive a system's statistics from GOE to GUE at a disorder-induced metal-insulator transition.

If $T^2=-1$, then this is a consequence of Kramers' theorem for systems with half-integer spin and significant spin–orbit interaction. The resulting Hamiltonians are naturally described by quaternion-Hermitian matrices. It has been observed in Kramers doublet and many quantum chaotic systems. It is also possible to construct such a system without spin.
