= Khandker Abdul Muttalib =

Theoretical physicist

- Education: Princeton University
- Known for: Muttalib-Borodin ensemble Random matrix theory of quantum transport
- Awards: Fellow of the American Physical Society (2005)
- Scientific career
- Fields: Condensed matter physics, random matrix theory
- Workplaces: University of Florida

Khandker Abdul Muttalib is a professor of physics at the University of Florida. His research is on random matrix theory and electronic transport in disordered conductors. He co-developed a random matrix theory of quantum transport, and in 1995 he introduced the model now known as the Muttalib-Borodin ensemble. He has also worked on superconductivity in disordered metals, the conductance distribution of disordered quantum wires, the anomalous Hall effect and thermoelectric devices based on nanowires. He was elected a Fellow of the American Physical Society in 2005.

== Career ==
Muttalib received his PhD from Princeton University. He joined the University of Florida in 1987 and became an associate professor of physics there in 1992. He is a professor of physics at the University of Florida.

== Research ==
In 1983 Muttalib and his colleagues proposed that disorder lowers the superconducting transition temperature of the A15 compounds because localization increases the effective Coulomb repulsion. He proposed an explanation of the origin of Aharonov-Bohm oscillations with a period of hc/2e, and found that within a two-band model of spinless electrons in one dimension, superconductivity can occur even with repulsive interactions between electrons.

In 1987 Muttalib and colleagues developed a random matrix theory of quantum transport, which they modelled on the Wigner-Dyson theory of energy levels. In it the probability distribution of the transmission eigenvalues maximizes the entropy for a given mean density of the eigenvalues. Muttalib and his coworkers then used the asymptotic form of q-Hermite polynomials to obtain the exact kernel of a unitary random matrix ensemble with a log-squared confining potential. He later proposed that the critical level statistics are related to weakly overlapping multifractal wave functions in systems such as the Anderson model at the metal-insulator transition.

In 1995 Muttalib introduced a biorthogonal ensemble with two-body interactions. In it the eigenvalues repel one another, and their powers also repel one another. He proposed it as a simplified model of the probability distribution of transmission eigenvalues in disordered conductors without time-reversal symmetry. He pointed out that these ensembles are determinantal. Alexei Borodin later computed their correlation kernels, and the ensembles are now known as Muttalib-Borodin ensembles.

With Peter Wölfle, Muttalib used random matrix theory to predict that in quasi-one-dimensional samples just beyond the localization threshold, the transmittance has a one-sided log-normal distribution. Muttalib also formulated a generalized Dorokhov-Mello-Pereyra-Kumar (DMPK) equation which, unlike the original DMPK equation, contains information about the dimension of the system.

In 2006 Muttalib and Wölfle studied the anomalous Hall effect theoretically in a model of impurity scattering that includes spin-orbit scattering, and discussed the logarithmic correction to the anomalous Hall conductivity. In 2007 Muttalib and his colleagues observed a logarithmic temperature dependence of the anomalous Hall conductivity in ultrathin polycrystalline iron films and explained its sample dependence through weak localization.

In 2015 Muttalib and a colleague proposed a thermoelectric device with nanowires subject to a gate voltage that can be tuned to optimize the efficiency and power output for different temperature differences and loads.

== Awards ==
- 2005 - Fellow of the American Physical Society, American Physical Society

== Selected publications ==
- Anderson, P. W.; Muttalib, K. A.; Ramakrishnan, T. V. (1983). "Theory of the 'universal' degradation of T_{c} in high-temperature superconductors". Physical Review B. 28 (1): 117–120. doi:10.1103/PhysRevB.28.117.
- Muttalib, K. A.; Pichard, J.-L.; Stone, A. Douglas (1987). "Random-Matrix Theory and Universal Statistics for Disordered Quantum Conductors". Physical Review Letters. 59 (21): 2475–2478. doi:10.1103/PhysRevLett.59.2475.
- Muttalib, K. A.; Chen, Y.; Ismail, M. E. H.; Nicopoulos, V. N. (1993). "New family of unitary random matrices". Physical Review Letters. 71 (4): 471–475. doi:10.1103/PhysRevLett.71.471.
- Muttalib, K. A. (1995). "Random matrix models with additional interactions". Journal of Physics A: Mathematical and General. 28 (5): L159–L164. doi:10.1088/0305-4470/28/5/003.
- Kravtsov, V. E.; Muttalib, K. A. (1997). "New Class of Random Matrix Ensembles with Multifractal Eigenvectors". Physical Review Letters. 79 (10): 1913–1916. doi:10.1103/PhysRevLett.79.1913.
