= Asymmetric simple exclusion process =

Interacting particle system

In probability theory, the asymmetric simple exclusion process (ASEP) is an interacting particle system introduced in 1970 by Frank Spitzer. Many articles have been published on it in the physics and mathematics literature since then, and it has become a "default stochastic model for transport phenomena".

The process with parameters $p, q \geqslant 0,\, p + q = 1$ is a continuous-time Markov process on $S = \lbrace 0, 1\rbrace^{\mathbb{Z}}$, the 1s being thought of as particles and the 0s as empty sites. Each particle waits a random amount of time having the distribution of an exponential random variable with mean one and then attempts a jump, one site to the right with probability $p$ and one site to the left with probability $q$. However, the jump is performed only if there is no particle at the target site. Otherwise, nothing happens and the particle waits another exponential time. All particles are doing this independently of each other.

The model is related to the Kardar–Parisi–Zhang equation in the weakly asymmetric limit, i.e. when $p-q$ tends to zero under some particular scaling. Recently, progress has been made to understand the statistics of the current of particles and it appears that the Tracy–Widom distribution plays a key role.

== Works Cited ==
- Tracy, C. A.; Widom, H. (2009), "Asymptotics in ASEP with step initial condition", Communications in Mathematical Physics, 290 (1): 129–154, arXiv:0807.1713, Bibcode:2009CMaPh.290..129T, doi:10.1007/s00220-009-0761-0, S2CID 14730756.
- Bertini, L.; Giacomin, G. (2007), "Stochastic Burgers and KPZ equations from particle systems", Communications in Mathematical Physics, 183 (3): 571–607, Bibcode:1997CMaPh.183..571B, doi:10.1007/s002200050044, S2CID 122139894.
