= Wigner surmise =

Scientific hypothesis in mathematical physics

In mathematical physics, the Wigner surmise is a statement about the probability distribution of the spaces between points in the spectra of nuclei of heavy atoms, which have many degrees of freedom, or quantum systems with few degrees of freedom but chaotic classical dynamics. It was proposed by Eugene Wigner in probability theory. The surmise was a result of Wigner's introduction of random matrices in the field of nuclear physics. The surmise consists of two postulates:

- In a simple sequence (spin and parity are same), the probability density function for a spacing is given by,

$$p_w(s) = \frac{\pi s}{2} e^{-\pi s^2/4}.$$

Here, $s = \frac{S}{D}$ where S is a particular spacing and D is the mean distance between neighboring intervals.

- In a mixed sequence (spin and parity are different), the probability density function can be obtained by randomly superimposing simple sequences.

The above result is exact for $2\times 2$ real symmetric matrices $M$, with elements that are independent standard gaussian random variables, with joint distribution proportional to

$$e^{-\frac{1}{2}{\rm Tr}(M^2)}=e^{-\frac{1}{2}{\rm Tr}\left(\begin{array}{cc}a & b \\b & c
\\\end{array}\right)^2}=e^{-\frac{1}{2}a^2-\frac{1}{2}c^2-b^2}.$$

In practice, it is a good approximation for the actual distribution for real symmetric matrices of any dimension. The corresponding result for complex hermitian matrices (which is also exact in the $2\times 2$ case and a good approximation in general) with distribution proportional to $e^{-\frac{1}{2}{\rm Tr}(MM^\dagger)}$, is given by

$$p_w(s) = \frac{32 s^2}{\pi^2} e^{-4s^2/\pi}.$$

== History ==
During the conference on Neutron Physics by Time-of-Flight, held at Gatlinburg, Tennessee, November 1 and 2, 1956, Wigner delivered a presentation on the theoretical arrangement of neighboring neutron resonances (with matching spin and parity) in heavy nuclei. In the presentation he gave the following guess:

Perhaps I am now too courageous when I try to guess the distribution of the distances between successive levels (of energies of heavy nuclei). Theoretically, the situation is quite simple if one attacks the problem in a simpleminded fashion. The question is simply what are the distances of the characteristic values of a symmetric matrix with random coefficients.

— Eugene Wigner, Results and theory of resonance absorption

At the time of statement, there was little data to prove the surmise. The situation quickly improved as people gathered more data. Firk et al. began a project in 1956, finishing in 1960, studying the first 100 resonances in ^{238}U + n at energies up to 8 keV. The data ruled out an exponential distribution and provided the best then-available evidence in support of Wigner’s surmise.

== See also ==
- Wigner semicircle distribution
- BGS conjecture
