= Estelle Basor =

American mathematician (born 1947)

- Born: 1947 (age 78–79)
- Title: Professor emeritus

Academic background
- Education: University of California, Santa Cruz
- Thesis: Asymptotic Formulas for Toeplitz Determinants (1975)
- Doctoral advisor: Harold Widom

Academic work
- Discipline: Mathematics
- Institutions: California Polytechnic State University; American Institute of Mathematics
- Main interests: Operator theory Random matrices

Estelle Lucille Basor (born 1947) is an American mathematician interested in operator theory and the theory of random matrices. She is professor emeritus of mathematics at the California Polytechnic State University (Cal Poly), and deputy director of the American Institute of Mathematics.

== Education and career ==
Basor earned a bachelor's degree in mathematics from the University of California, Santa Cruz in 1969, and completed a Ph.D. there in 1975. Her dissertation, supervised by Harold Widom, was Asymptotic Formulas for Toeplitz Determinants.

She joined the Cal Poly faculty in 1976, and taught there until retiring in 2008.

She served as an American Mathematical Society Council member at large from 2011 to 2013.

== Recognition ==
At Cal Poly, she was the 2005 winner of the Distinguished Research, Creative Activity and Professional Development Award, and a colloquium in her and professor Rami Shani’s honor was held in 2006. She was elected to the 2018 class of fellows of the American Mathematical Society.

== Personal life ==
Basor's husband, Kent E. Morrison, is also a mathematician who went to school with her at Santa Cruz, worked with her at Cal Poly, and is now associated with the American Institute of Mathematics.
