= Craig Tracy (mathematician) =

American mathematician (1945–2026)

- Born: Craig Arnold Tracy; September 9, 1945; United Kingdom
- Died: January 29, 2026 (aged 80)
- Education: University of Missouri; Stony Brook University
- Known for: Tracy–Widom distribution
- Awards: George Pólya Prize; Norbert Wiener Prize in Applied Mathematics; Leroy P. Steele Prize
- Scientific career
- Fields: Mathematics, mathematical physics, probability theory
- Workplaces: University of Rochester; Stony Brook University; Dartmouth College; University of California, Davis
- Thesis: Spin-Spin Scale-Functions in the Ising and XY-Models (1973)
- Doctoral advisor: Barry M. McCoy
- Website: www.math.ucdavis.edu/~tracy/

Craig Arnold Tracy (September 9, 1945 – January 29, 2026) was an American mathematician known for his contributions to mathematical physics, probability theory, random matrix theory, and the Tracy–Widom distribution, developed with Harold Widom.

== Early life and education ==
Tracy was born in the United Kingdom and moved as an infant to Missouri, where he grew up. He received a B.Sc. in physics from the University of Missouri in 1967. He then studied as a Woodrow Wilson Fellow at Stony Brook University, where he received a Ph.D. in 1973 under the supervision of Barry M. McCoy. His doctoral thesis was titled Spin-Spin Scale-Functions in the Ising and XY-Models.

== Career ==
After receiving his doctorate, Tracy held research positions at the University of Rochester and Stony Brook University. He joined the faculty of Dartmouth College in 1978 and moved to the University of California, Davis in 1984. At UC Davis he served as chair of the Department of Mathematics from 1994 to 1998 and became Distinguished Professor in 2003. He retired in 2021 as Distinguished Professor emeritus.

== Research ==
Tracy's early work concerned exactly solvable models in statistical mechanics, including the Ising model and XY model. With McCoy, Tai Tsun Wu, and Eytan Barouch, he studied the appearance of Painlevé transcendents in correlation functions of statistical mechanical models.

He is best known for his collaboration with Harold Widom on random matrix theory and related operator-theoretic problems. Their work on asymptotic analysis, Fredholm determinants, and level-spacing distributions led to the Tracy–Widom distribution, which describes limiting distributions for the largest eigenvalues of several random matrix ensembles and appears in probability, statistical physics, and asymptotic combinatorics.

== Awards and honors ==
- Woodrow Wilson Fellowship, 1967–1968
- Japan Society for the Promotion of Science Fellowship, 1991
- George Pólya Prize, shared with Harold Widom, 2002
- Fellow of the American Academy of Arts and Sciences, 2006
- Norbert Wiener Prize in Applied Mathematics, shared with Harold Widom, 2007
- Fellow of the Society for Industrial and Applied Mathematics, 2011
- Fellow of the American Mathematical Society, 2013
- Leroy P. Steele Prize for Seminal Contribution to Research, shared with Harold Widom, 2020

== Selected publications ==
- Wu, Tai Tsun; McCoy, Barry M.; Tracy, Craig A.; Barouch, Eytan (1976). "Spin-spin correlation functions for the two-dimensional Ising model: Exact theory in the scaling region". Physical Review B. 13 (1): 316–374. doi:10.1103/PhysRevB.13.316.
- Tracy, Craig A.; Widom, Harold (1994). "Level-spacing distributions and the Airy kernel". Communications in Mathematical Physics. 159: 151–174. arXiv:hep-th/9211141. doi:10.1007/BF02100489.
- Tracy, Craig A.; Widom, Harold (1994). "Level-spacing distributions and the Bessel kernel". Communications in Mathematical Physics. 161: 289–309. arXiv:hep-th/9304063. doi:10.1007/BF02099779.
- Tracy, Craig A.; Widom, Harold (1994). "Fredholm determinants, differential equations and matrix models". Communications in Mathematical Physics. 163: 33–72. arXiv:hep-th/9306042. doi:10.1007/BF02101734.
