= Harold Widom =

American mathematician (1932–2021)

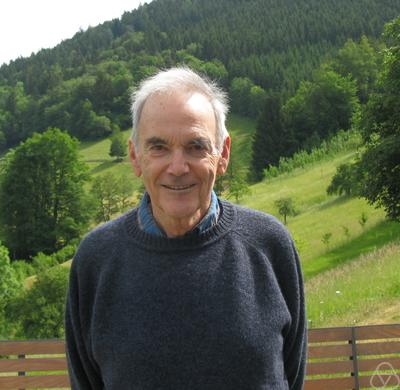
- Born: September 23, 1932; Newark, New Jersey, U.S.
- Died: January 20, 2021 (aged 88); Santa Cruz, California, U.S.
- Education: University of Chicago; City College of New York
- Scientific career
- Fields: Mathematics
- Workplaces: Cornell University; University of California, Santa Cruz
- Doctoral advisor: Irving Kaplansky

Harold Widom (September 23, 1932 – January 20, 2021) was an American mathematician best known for his contributions to operator theory and random matrices. He was appointed to the Department of Mathematics at the University of California, Santa Cruz in 1968 and became professor emeritus in 1994.

== Education and research ==
Widom was born in Newark, New Jersey. He studied at Stuyvesant High School, graduating in 1949, and was a member of the school's math team along with his brother, physical chemist Benjamin Widom (1944, 1948). Widom attended City College of New York until 1951, during which he was one of the winners of the William Lowell Putnam Mathematical Competition (1951). At the University of Chicago he obtained an M.S. (1952) and Ph.D., the latter on a thesis Embedding of AW*-algebras advised by Irving Kaplansky (1955). He taught mathematics at Cornell University (1955–68) where he started his work on Toeplitz and Wiener-Hopf operators, partly inspired by Mark Kac.

Widom was appointed in the Department of Mathematics at the University of California, Santa Cruz, and became professor emeritus in 1994. His research areas were in integral equations and operator theory, in particular the determination of the spectra of a semi-infinite Toeplitz matrix and Wiener-Hopf operators, and the asymptotic behavior of the spectra of various classes of operators. The latter was looked at from the point of view of pseudodifferential operators (which generalize both integral and partial differential operators) on manifolds.

More recently, his mathematical contributions with his long-term collaborator Craig Tracy have been recognized through the award of several prizes for their joint work on Tracy–Widom distribution functions for random matrices. They used integral operators to obtain explicit representations, in terms of Painlevé transcendents, of the limiting distributions of the largest and smallest eigenvalues in many models of random matrices (see Fredholm determinants). These same distributions have since been shown to arise in numerous other physical models, in random growth models, and in asymptotic combinatorics.

He has been the author of two books and more than 120 journal articles, and was an associate editor of Asymptotic Analysis, Journal of Integral Equations and Applications and Mathematical Physics, Analysis, and Geometry. He was an honorary editor of Integral Equations and Operator Theory.

Widom died from complications of COVID-19 at home in Santa Cruz, California, on January 20, 2021, at age 88.

== Awards ==
- Fellow of the American Mathematical Society, 2012
- Norbert Wiener Prize in Applied Mathematics 2006, shared with Craig Tracy
- American Academy of Arts and Sciences elected, 2006
- George Pólya Prize 2002, shared with Craig Tracy, for their work on random matrices
- Guggenheim Fellow 1967 and 1972
- Sloan Fellowship 1964–65
- National Science Foundation Postdoctoral Fellowship, 1959–60

== Bibliography ==
- Basor, Estelle L.; Gohberg, Israel (1994), Toeplitz Operators and Related Topics: The Harold Widom Anniversary Volume : Workshop on Toeplitz and Wiener–Hopf Operators, Santa Cruz, California, September 20–22, 1992, Oper. Theory Adv. Appl., vol. 71, Birkhäuser, ISBN 3-7643-5068-7. (The proceedings of this 60th birthday conference contain a short biography by Estelle L. Basor and Edward M. Landesman.)
