= BGS conjecture =

The Bohigas–Giannoni–Schmit (BGS) conjecture also known as the random matrix conjecture) for simple quantum mechanical systems (ergodic with a classical limit) few degrees of freedom holds that spectra of time reversal-invariant systems whose classical analogues are K-systems show the same fluctuation properties as predicted by the GOE (Gaussian orthogonal ensembles).

Alternatively, the spectral fluctuation measures of a classically chaotic quantum system coincide with those of the canonical random-matrix ensemble in the same symmetry class (unitary, orthogonal, or symplectic).

That is, the Hamiltonian of a microscopic analogue of a classical chaotic system can be modeled by a random matrix from a Gaussian ensemble as the distance of a few spacings between eigenvalues of a chaotic Hamiltonian operator generically statistically correlates with the spacing laws for eigenvalues of large random matrices.

A simple example of the unfolded quantum energy levels in a classically chaotic system correlating like that would be Sinai billiards:

- Energy levels: $-\frac{\hbar^2}{2\mathit{m}}\bigtriangledown^2\psi+\mathit{V}(\mathit{x})\psi={\mathit{E}_\mathit{i}}\psi$
- Spectral density: $\rho(\mathit{x})=\sum_\mathit{i}\delta(\mathit{x}-\mathit{E}_\mathit{i})$
- Average spectral density: $\langle\rho(\mathit{x})\rangle$
- Correlation: $\langle\rho(\mathit{x})\rho(\mathit{y})\rangle-\langle\rho(\mathit{x})\rangle\langle\rho(\mathit{y})\rangle$
- Unfolding: $\rho(\mathit{x})\rightarrow\frac{\rho(\mathit{x})}{\langle\rho(\mathit{x})\rangle}$
- Unfolded correlation: $\frac{\langle\rho(\mathit{x})\rho(\mathit{y})\rangle}{\langle\rho(\mathit{x})\rangle\langle\rho(\mathit{y})\rangle}-1$
- BGS conjecture: $\frac{\langle\rho(\mathit{x})\rho(\mathit{y})\rangle}{\langle\rho(\mathit{x})\rangle\langle\rho(\mathit{y})\rangle}-1=\frac{\langle\rho(\mathit{x})\rho(\mathit{y})\rangle_\operatorname{RMT}}{\langle\rho(\mathit{x})\rangle_\operatorname{RMT}\langle\rho(\mathit{y})\rangle_\operatorname{RMT}}-1$

The conjecture remains unproven despite supporting numerical evidence.

== Links ==
- the BGS conjecture in Scholarpedia.
