= Intersubband polariton =

Excitation

Intersubband transitions (also known as intraband transitions) are dipolar allowed optical excitations between the quantized electronic energy levels within the conduction band of semiconductor heterostructures. Intersubband transitions when coupled with an optical resonator form new, mixed-state photons. This mixing is referred to as an intersubband cavity-polariton. These transitions exhibit an anticrossing in energy with a separation known as vacuum-Rabi splitting, similar to level repulsion in atomic physics.

== Quantum cascade laser ==
A cascading of intersubband transitions is the mechanism behind a quantum cascade laser which produces a monochromatic coherent light-source at infrared wavelengths.

== Color of metals ==
Most metals reflect almost all visible light, due to the presence of free charges, and are therefore silvery in color or mirror-like. However, some metals like gold and copper are more reddish, and this is due to absorption from intersubband transitions that occur at blue wavelengths.

== See also ==
- Fluorescence (interband transitions)
