= Determinantal point process =

Stochastic point process in mathematics

In mathematics, a determinantal point process is a stochastic point process, the probability distribution of which is characterized as a determinant of some function. They are suited for modelling global negative correlations, and for efficient algorithms of sampling, marginalization, conditioning, and other inference tasks. Such processes arise as important tools in random matrix theory, combinatorics, physics, machine learning, and wireless network modeling.

== Introduction ==
=== Intuition ===
Consider some positively charged particles confined in a 1-dimensional box $[-1, +1]$. Due to electrostatic repulsion, the locations of the charged particles are negatively correlated. That is, if one particle is in a small segment $[x, x + \delta x]$, then that makes the other particles less likely to be in the same set. The strength of repulsion between two particles at locations $x, x'$ can be characterized by a function $K(x, x')$.

=== Formal definition ===
Let $\Lambda$ be a locally compact Polish space and $\mu$ be a Radon measure on $\Lambda$. In most concrete applications, these are Euclidean space $\R^n$ with its Lebesgue measure. A kernel function is a measurable function $K: \Lambda^2 \to \mathbb{C}$.

We say that $X$ is a determinantal point process on $\Lambda$ with kernel $K$ if it is a simple point process on $\Lambda$ with a joint intensity or correlation function (which is the density of its factorial moment measure) given by

$$\rho_n(x_1,\ldots,x_n) = \det[K(x_i,x_j)]_{1 \le i,j \le n}$$

for every n ≥ 1 and x_{1}, ..., x_{n} ∈ Λ.

== Properties ==
=== Existence ===
The following two conditions are necessary and sufficient for the existence of a determinantal random point process with intensities ρ_{k}.

- Symmetry: ρ_{k} is invariant under action of the symmetric group S_{k}. Thus:
  $$\rho_k(x_{\sigma(1)}, \ldots, x_{\sigma(k)}) = \rho_k(x_1, \ldots, x_k)\quad \forall \sigma \in S_k, k$$
- Positivity: For any N, and any collection of measurable, bounded functions $\varphi_k : \Lambda^k \to \mathbb{R}$, k = 1, ..., N with compact support:
  If
  $$\varphi_0 + \sum_{k=1}^N \sum_{i_1 \neq \cdots \neq i_k } \varphi_k(x_{i_1} \ldots x_{i_k})\ge 0 \text{ for all }k,(x_i)_{i = 1}^k$$
  Then
  $$\varphi_0 + \sum_{k=1}^N \int_{\Lambda^k} \varphi_k(x_1, \ldots, x_k)\rho_k(x_1,\ldots,x_k)\,\textrm{d}x_1\cdots\textrm{d}x_k \ge0 \text{ for all } k, (x_i)_{i = 1}^k$$

=== Uniqueness ===
A sufficient condition for the uniqueness of a determinantal random process with joint intensities ρ_{k} is
$$\sum_{k = 0}^\infty \left( \frac{1}{k!} \int_{A^k} \rho_k(x_1,\ldots,x_k) \, \textrm{d}x_1\cdots\textrm{d}x_k \right)^{-\frac{1}{k}} = \infty$$
for every bounded Borel A ⊆ Λ.

== Examples ==
=== Gaussian unitary ensemble ===
The eigenvalues of a random m × m Hermitian matrix drawn from the Gaussian unitary ensemble (GUE) form a determinantal point process on $\mathbb{R}$ with kernel

$$K_m(x,y) = \sum_{k=0}^{m-1} \psi_k(x) \psi_k(y)$$

where $\psi_k(x)$ is the $k$th oscillator wave function defined by

$$\psi_k(x)= \frac{1}{\sqrt{\sqrt{2n}n!}}H_k(x) e^{-x^2/4}$$

and $H_k(x)$ is the $k$th Hermite polynomial.

=== Airy process ===
The Airy process is governed by the so called extended Airy kernel which is a generalization of the Airy kernel function
$$K^{\mathrm{Ai}}(x, y)=\frac{\operatorname{Ai}(x) \operatorname{Ai}^{\prime}(y)-\operatorname{Ai}(y) \operatorname{Ai}^{\prime}(x)}{x-y}$$
where $\operatorname{Ai}$ is the Airy function. This process arises from rescaled eigenvalues near the spectral edge of the Gaussian Unitary Ensemble.

=== Poissonized Plancherel measure ===
The poissonized Plancherel measure on integer partition (and therefore on Young diagrams) plays an important role in the study of the longest increasing subsequence of a random permutation. The point process corresponding to a random Young diagram, expressed in modified Frobenius coordinates, is a determinantal point process on $\mathbb{Z}$ + 1/2 with the discrete Bessel kernel, given by:

$$K(x,y) =
\begin{cases}
\sqrt{\theta} \, \dfrac{k_+(|x|,|y|)}{|x|-|y|} & \text{if } xy >0,\\[12pt]
\sqrt{\theta} \, \dfrac{k_-(|x|,|y|)}{x-y} & \text{if } xy <0,
\end{cases}$$
where
$$k_+(x,y) = J_{x-\frac{1}{2}}(2\sqrt{\theta})J_{y+\frac{1}{2}}(2\sqrt{\theta}) - J_{x+\frac{1}{2}}(2\sqrt{\theta})J_{y-\frac{1}{2}}(2\sqrt{\theta}),$$
$$k_-(x,y) = J_{x-\frac{1}{2}}(2\sqrt{\theta})J_{y-\frac{1}{2}}(2\sqrt{\theta}) + J_{x+\frac{1}{2}}(2\sqrt{\theta})J_{y+\frac{1}{2}}(2\sqrt{\theta})$$
For J the Bessel function of the first kind, and θ the mean used in poissonization.

This serves as an example of a well-defined determinantal point process with non-Hermitian kernel (although its restriction to the positive and negative semi-axis is Hermitian).

=== Uniform spanning trees ===
Let G be a finite, undirected, connected graph, with edge set E. Define I^{e}:E → ℓ^{2}(E) as follows: first choose some arbitrary set of orientations for the edges E, and for each resulting, oriented edge e, define I^{e} to be the projection of a unit flow along e onto the subspace of ℓ^{2}(E) spanned by star flows. Then the uniformly random spanning tree of G is a determinantal point process on E, with kernel

$K(e,f) = \langle I^e,I^f \rangle ,\quad e,f \in E$.
