= Level repulsion =

Level repulsion is the quantum mechanical equivalent to a repulsion effect in oscillators. A system of two coupled oscillators has two natural frequencies. As the coupling strength between the oscillators increases, the lower frequency decreases and the higher increases.

== See also ==
- Avoided crossing
- Intersubband polariton
- Wigner–Ville distribution
