= Neutron time-of-flight scattering =

Neutron time-of-flight scattering is a form of inelastic neutron scattering. It can be pulsed or continuous.

In the pulsed version, the incoming neutron beam is collineated and monochomatized by a neutron chopper, which cuts the incoming beam into short pulses of known velocity, direction, and time at which it leaves the chopper. The pulses scatter off the sample, and the scattered neutrons are detected by a screen of detectors. Each detector detects and measures the time at which neutrons arrive at the detector.

For example, a double-disk neutron chopper consists of two rotating disks with ends notched, in parallel, separated at a given distance $d$, and rotating at a given angular velocity $\omega$. Neutrons entering one notch could only exit out of the other notch if its velocity is $v_1 = n\omega d/2\pi$ for some $n=1, 2, 3, \dots$. To make the output monochromatic, a cascade of several choppers is used.

After each pulse departure event, many neutron arrival events occur at various angles and time-delays. By taking average over many pulses of the same velocity and direction, we obtain a time-delay function of form $\Delta t(\hat k)$, which denotes the average time-delay between the departure of the pulse and the arrival of scattered neutron at the detector at direction $\hat k$.

Now, suppose input neutron has velocity $v_1$, and the distance between the chopper output and the sample is $L_1$, and the distance between the sample and the detector at direction $\hat k$ is $L_2(\hat k)$, then the velocity of the post-scattering neutron is $v_2(\hat k) = \frac{L_2(\hat k)}{\Delta t(\hat k) - L_1/v_1}$. This then allows us to calculate the momentum and energy transferred by the neutron to the sample.

Inverse geometry spectrometers are also possible. In this case, the final position and velocity are fixed, and the incident coordinates are varied.

The neutron time-of-flight peak for a pulsed-source moderator can be modeled using the Ikeda-Carpenter function. The Ikeda-Carpenter function is:

$\phi(v,t) = \frac{\alpha}{2}\{(1-R)*(\alpha t^2)e^{-\alpha t}+2R\frac{\alpha^2\beta}{(\alpha-\beta)^3}\}$

where $\alpha$ and $\beta$ are the fast and slow neutron decay constants respectively, $R$ is a maxing coefficient relating to moderator temperature, and $t$ is the time. $\alpha$ and $R$ can be further modeled as being dependent on the wavelength $\lambda$. The refinable parameters of the Ikeda-Carpenter function are $\alpha_0$, $\alpha_1$, $\beta_0$, and $\kappa$.

$\alpha = 1/(\alpha_0 + \lambda*\alpha_1)$

$\beta = 1/\beta_0$

$R=exp(-81.799/(\kappa*\lambda^2))$

== Sources ==
Time-of-flight scattering can be performed at either a research reactor or a spallation source.

=== Pulsed ===
Time-of-flight spectrometers at pulsed sources include Pharos at LANSCE's Lujan Center at Los Alamos National Laboratory, MAPS, MARI, HET, MERLIN and LET at the ISIS neutron source, and ARCS, CNCS, and SEQUOIA at the Spallation Neutron Source, iBIX, SuperHRPD, PLANET, SENJU, TAKUMI, iMATERIA and NOVA at the J-PARC and SKAT-EPSILON, DIN-2PI, NERA at the IBR-2 pulsed reactor.

=== Continuous ===
Time-of-flight spectrometers at continuous sources include DCS and FCS at the NIST laboratories in Maryland, IN4, IN5, and IN6 at the Institut Laue-Langevin, TOFTOF at the Forschungsneutronenquelle Heinz Maier-Leibnitz, PELICAN at the Australian Nuclear Science and Technology Organisation, FOCUS at the Paul Scherrer Institute.

=== Others ===
Integrated Infrastructure Initiative for Neutron Scattering and Muon Spectroscopy (NMI3) is a European consortium of 18 partner organisations from 12 countries, including all major facilities in the fields of neutron scattering and muon spectroscopy.
