= Wigner semicircle distribution =

Probability distribution

Wigner semicircle
- Probability density function

- Cumulative distribution function
- Parameters: $R>0\!$ radius (real)
- Support: $x \in [-R;+R]\!$
- PDF: $\frac2{\pi R^2}\,\sqrt{R^2-x^2}\!$
- CDF: $\frac12+\frac{x\sqrt{R^2-x^2}}{\pi R^2} + \frac{\arcsin\!\left(\frac{x}{R}\right)}{\pi}\!$ for $-R\leq x \leq R$
- Mean: $0\,$
- Median: $0\,$
- Mode: $0\,$
- Variance: $\frac{R^2}{4}\!$
- Skewness: $0\,$
- Excess kurtosis: $-1\,$
- Entropy: $\ln (\pi R) - \frac12 \,$
- MGF: $2\,\frac{I_1(R\,t)}{R\,t}$
- CF: $2\,\frac{J_1(R\,t)}{R\,t}$

The Wigner semicircle distribution, named after the physicist Eugene Wigner, is the probability distribution defined on the domain [−R, R] whose probability density function f is a scaled semicircle, i.e. a semi-ellipse, centered at (0, 0):

$$f(x)={2 \over \pi R^2}\sqrt{R^2-x^2\,}\,$$

for −R ≤ x ≤ R, and f(x) = 0 if |x| > R. The parameter R is commonly referred to as the "radius" parameter of the distribution.

The distribution arises as the limiting distribution of the eigenvalues of many random symmetric matrices, that is, as the dimensions of the random matrix approach infinity. The distribution of the spacing or gaps between eigenvalues is addressed by the similarly named Wigner surmise.

== General properties ==
Because of symmetry, all of the odd-order moments of the Wigner distribution are zero. For positive integers n, the 2n-th moment of this distribution is

$$\frac{1}{n+1}\left({R \over 2}\right)^{2n} {2n\choose n}\,$$

In the typical special case that R = 2, this sequence coincides with the Catalan numbers 1, 2, 5, 14, etc. In particular, the second moment is R^{2}/4 and the fourth moment is R^{4}/8, which shows that the excess kurtosis is −1. As can be calculated using the residue theorem, the Stieltjes transform of the Wigner distribution is given by

$$s(z)=-\frac{2}{R^2}(z-\sqrt{z^2-R^2})$$

for complex numbers z with positive imaginary part, where the complex square root is taken to have positive imaginary part.

The Wigner distribution coincides with a scaled and shifted beta distribution: if Y is a beta-distributed random variable with parameters α = β = 3/2, then the random variable 2RY – R exhibits a Wigner semicircle distribution with radius R. By this transformation it is straightforward to directly compute some statistical quantities for the Wigner distribution in terms of those for the beta distributions, which are better known.

The Chebyshev polynomials of the second kind are orthogonal polynomials with respect to the Wigner semicircle distribution of radius 1.

== Characteristic function and moment generating function ==
The characteristic function of the Wigner distribution can be determined from that of the beta-variate Y:

$$\varphi(t)=e^{-iRt}\varphi_Y(2Rt)=e^{-iRt}{}_1F_1\left(\frac{3}{2}; 3; 2iRt\right)=\frac{2J_1(Rt)}{Rt},$$

where _{1}F_{1} is the confluent hypergeometric function and J_{1} is the Bessel function of the first kind.

Likewise the moment generating function can be calculated as

$$M(t)=e^{-Rt}M_Y(2Rt)=e^{-Rt}{}_1F_1\left(\frac{3}{2}; 3; 2Rt\right)=\frac{2I_1(Rt)}{Rt}$$

where I_{1} is the modified Bessel function of the first kind. The final equalities in both of the above lines are well-known identities relating the confluent hypergeometric function with the Bessel functions.

== Relation to free probability ==
In free probability theory, the role of Wigner's semicircle distribution is analogous to that of the normal distribution in classical probability theory. Namely, in free probability theory, the role of cumulants is occupied by "free cumulants", whose relation to ordinary cumulants is simply that the role of the set of all partitions of a finite set in the theory of ordinary cumulants is replaced by the set of all noncrossing partitions of a finite set. Just as the cumulants of degree more than 2 of a probability distribution are all zero if and only if the distribution is normal, so also, the free cumulants of degree more than 2 of a probability distribution are all zero if and only if the distribution is Wigner's semicircle distribution.

== See also ==
- Wigner surmise
- The Wigner semicircle distribution is the limit of the Kesten–McKay distributions, as the parameter d tends to infinity.
- In number-theoretic literature, the Wigner distribution is sometimes called the Sato–Tate distribution. See Sato–Tate conjecture.
- Marchenko–Pastur distribution or Free Poisson distribution

== Literature ==
- Anderson, Greg W.; Guionnet, Alice; Zeitouni, Ofer (2010). An introduction to random matrices. Cambridge Studies in Advanced Mathematics. Vol. 118. Cambridge: Cambridge University Press. doi:10.1017/CBO9780511801334. ISBN 978-0-521-19452-5. MR 2670897. Zbl 1184.15023.
- Bai, Zhidong; Silverstein, Jack W. (2010). Spectral analysis of large dimensional random matrices. Springer Series in Statistics (Second edition of 2006 original ed.). New York: Springer. doi:10.1007/978-1-4419-0661-8. ISBN 978-1-4419-0660-1. MR 2567175. Zbl 1301.60002.
- Johnson, Norman L.; Kotz, Samuel; Balakrishnan, N. (1995). Continuous univariate distributions. Volume 2. Wiley Series in Probability and Mathematical Statistics: Applied Probability and Statistics (Second edition of 1970 original ed.). New York: John Wiley & Sons, Inc. ISBN 0-471-58494-0. MR 1326603. Zbl 0821.62001.
- Olver, Frank W. J.; Lozier, Daniel W.; Boisvert, Ronald F.; Clark, Charles W., eds. (2010). NIST handbook of mathematical functions. Cambridge: Cambridge University Press. ISBN 978-0-521-14063-8. MR 2723248. Zbl 1198.00002.
- Wigner, Eugene P. (1955). "Characteristic vectors of bordered matrices with infinite dimensions". Annals of Mathematics. Second Series. 62 (3): 548–564. doi:10.2307/1970079. MR 0077805. Zbl 0067.08403.
