= Arctic circle theorem =

The arctic circle theorem is a result in probability theory and combinatorics concerning random domino tilings of large Aztec diamonds. It say that as the order of the Aztec diamond tends to infinity almost all uniformly random tilings exhibit a frozen region near the boundary, separated from a disordered region by a circle. This boundary is known as the arctic circle.

The theorem was proved in 1995 by William Jockusch, James Propp and Peter Shor. Subsequent work by Kurt Johansson established that fluctuations of the arctic boundary converge, after suitable rescaling, to the Airy process. These results connect random tilings to random matrix theory and the KPZ university class.

== Boundary fluctuations ==
In 2005 Kurt Johansson proved a finer result describing fluctuations of the arctic boundary. For an appropriately defined boundary process $X_n(t)$, and when horizontal and vertical dominoes have equal weight, he showed that

$$\frac{X_n(2^{-1/6}n^{2/3}t)-n/\sqrt{2}}{2^{-5/6}n^{1/3}}\xrightarrow{d}\mathcal A_2(t)-t^2,$$

as $n\to\infty$, in the sense of finite-dimensional distributions. Here, $\mathcal A_2$ denotes the Airy_{2} process.

The Airy process is closely related to the Tracy–Widom distribution governing the largest eigenvalue of random matrices from the Gaussian Unitary Ensemble (GUE). The fluctuation behavior of random domino tilings is also connected to the KPZ universality class.
