= Kardar–Parisi–Zhang equation =

Non-linear stochastic partial differential equation

In mathematics, the Kardar–Parisi–Zhang (KPZ) equation is a non-linear stochastic partial differential equation, introduced by Mehran Kardar, Giorgio Parisi, and Yi-Cheng Zhang in 1986. It describes the temporal change of a height field $h(\vec x,t)$ with spatial coordinate $\vec x$ and time coordinate $t$:

$$\frac{\partial h(\vec x,t)}{\partial t} = \nu \nabla^2 h + \frac{\lambda}{2} \left(\nabla h\right)^2 + \eta(\vec x,t) \; .$$

Here, $\eta(\vec x,t)$ is white Gaussian noise with average

$\langle \eta(\vec x,t) \rangle = 0$

and second moment

$\langle \eta(\vec x,t) \eta(\vec x',t') \rangle = 2D\delta^d(\vec x-\vec x')\delta(t-t'),$

$\nu$, $\lambda$, and $D$ are parameters of the model, and $d$ is the dimension.

In one spatial dimension, the KPZ equation corresponds to a stochastic version of Burgers' equation with field $u(x,t)$ via the substitution $u=-\lambda\, \partial h/\partial x$.

Via the renormalization group, the KPZ equation is conjectured to be the field theory of many surface growth models, such as the Eden model, ballistic deposition, and the weakly asymmetric single step solid on solid process (SOS) model. A rigorous proof has been given by Bertini and Giacomin in the case of the SOS model.

== KPZ universality class ==
Many interacting particle systems, such as the totally asymmetric simple exclusion process, lie in the KPZ universality class. This class is characterized by the following critical exponents in one spatial dimension (1 + 1 dimension): the roughness exponent $\alpha=\tfrac{1}{2}$, growth exponent $\beta=\tfrac{1}{3}$, and dynamic exponent $z=\tfrac{3}{2}$. In order to check if a growth model is within the KPZ class, one can calculate the width of the surface:

$$W(L,t)=\left\langle\frac1L\int_0^L \big( h(x,t)-\bar{h}(t)\big)^2 \, dx\right\rangle^{1/2},$$

where $\bar{h}(t)$ is the mean surface height at time $t$ and $L$ is the size of the system. For models within the KPZ class, the main properties of the surface $h(x,t)$ can be characterized by the Family–Vicsek scaling relation of the roughness

$$W(L,t) \approx L^{\alpha} f(t/L^z),$$

with a scaling function $f(u)$ satisfying

$$f(u) \propto \begin{cases} u^{\beta} & \ u\ll 1 \\
1 & \ u\gg1\end{cases}$$

In 2014, Hairer and Quastel showed that more generally, the following KPZ-like equations lie within the KPZ universality class:

$$\frac{\partial h(\vec x,t)}{\partial t} = \nu \nabla^2 h + P\left(\nabla h\right) + \eta(\vec x,t) \; ,$$

where $P$ is any even-degree polynomial.

A family of processes that are conjectured to be universal limits in the (1+1) KPZ universality class and govern the long time fluctuations are the Airy processes and the KPZ fixed point.

== Solving the KPZ equation ==
Due to the nonlinearity in the equation and the presence of space-time white noise, solutions to the KPZ equation are known to not be smooth or regular, but rather 'fractal' or 'rough.' Even without the nonlinear term, the equation reduces to the stochastic heat equation, whose solution is not differentiable in the space variable but satisfies a Hölder condition with exponent less than 1/2. Thus, the nonlinear term $\left(\nabla h\right)^2$ is ill-defined in a classical sense.

In 2013, Martin Hairer made a breakthrough in solving the KPZ equation by an extension of the Cole–Hopf transformation and constructing approximations using Feynman diagrams. In 2014, he was awarded the Fields Medal for this work on the KPZ equation, along with rough paths theory and regularity structures. There were 6 different analytic self-similar solutions found for the (1+1) KPZ equation with different analytic noise terms.

== Physical derivation ==
A common, non-rigorous derivation begins with an attempt to model surface growth during crystallization. Let $h(x, t)$ represent the height of the surface at position $x$ and time $t$. The surface is expected to evolve through time according to some variant on the diffusion equation,
$$\frac{\partial h(x,t)}{\partial t }=\frac{1}{2}\frac{\partial^{2} h(x,t)}{\partial x^2 }\text{,}$$
which acts to smooth the initial conditions. The diffusion equation itself cannot describe the surface evolution because it is deterministic, omitting the effects of random precipitation and dissolution.

The simplest adaptation adds a stochastic forcing:
$$\frac{\partial h(x,t)}{\partial t }=\frac{1}{2}\frac{\partial^{2} h(x,t)}{\partial x^{2}}+\eta(x,t),$$
where $\eta$ is Gaussian white noise with mean zero and covariance
$$E[\eta(x,t)\eta(x',t')]=\delta(x-x')\delta(t-t')\text{.}$$
That equation is the Edwards–Wilkinson (EW) equation, also known descriptively as the stochastic heat equation with additive noise. The EW equation is mathematically tractable, being linear; and solvable through Fourier analysis. It also exhibits an important symmetry retained in the final KPZ equation: if $h$ solves the EW equation when $\eta$ has mean 0, then $h+mt$ also solves the EW equation when $\eta$ has mean $m$. Thus any constant terms can be added or removed from the right-hand side without modifying physical applicability. However, the EW equation implies that fluctuations in $h$ are Gaussian, which is contrary to experiment. At least one term is missing for a physically-accurate model.

The key observation of Kardar, Parisi, and Zhang (KPZ) was that the missing term depends on surface's local slope, $\frac{\partial h(x,t)}{\partial x }$ The crystal surface grows normal to the (varying) surface, but $h$ is measured along a fixed height axis. Consequently regions with large $\frac{\partial h(x,t)}{\partial x }$ have longer surface length, and see more deposition.

One might hope that surface growth is accurately modeled through an equation of the form
$$\frac{\partial h(x,t)}{\partial t }=F\left(\frac{\partial h(x,t)}{\partial x }\right)+ \frac{1}{2}\frac{\partial^{2} h(x,t)}{\partial x^{2}}+\eta(x,t)$$
for some function $F$. If $F$ is solely proportional to local arclength, then $F$ should take (up to an additive constant, by the EW symmetry mentioned above) the value
$$F(s)=\lambda\sqrt{1+s^2}\text{,}$$
for some constant $\lambda$. However, that choice of $F$ gives an intractable equation.

The working physicist is now tempted by habit to simply expand $F$ as a Taylor series about $0$. This Taylor expansion cannot be mathematically justified. The function $\frac{\partial h(x,t)}{\partial x }$ is large, and has very large variation: there is no convenient point to Taylor-expand around. However, as discussed above, the KPZ equation is universal, in the sense that the same functions solve the KPZ equation for any $F(s)$ that is a nonconstant polynomial in $s^2$. For example, if $F$ were polynomial, then one could assume it quadratic without loss of generality.

With less rigor, one can compute that the renormalization group flow has a single fixpoint: namely, $F(s)=F''(0)s^2$. Thus if there is an interesting model to be found, then it must behave as though $F(s)=F''(0)s^2$. The KPZ equation's (extensive!) mathematical analysis is devoted to showing that the resulting equation is well-defined: ordinarily, tempered distributions have no square, but the divergence associated with the KPZ model can be mollified after applying the Hopf-Cole transformation.

For the sake of intuition, we will assume that
$$F(s)=F'(0)+F'(0)s+\frac{1}{2}F''(0)s^{2}\text{.}$$
The first term can be removed from the equation by the time-shift symmetry alluded to above in the EW equation: if $h(x,t)$ solves the KPZ equation, then $\tilde{h}(x,t):=h(x,t)-\lambda F(0)t$ solves
$$\frac{\partial h(x,t)}{\partial t }=-\lambda F(0)+ \frac{1}{2}\frac{\partial^{2} h(x,t)}{\partial x^{2} }+\eta(x,t).$$
The second can be removed from the equation by a constant velocity shift of coordinates, since if $h(x,t)$ solves the KPZ equation, then $\tilde{h}(x,t):=h(x- \lambda F'(0)t,t-\lambda F'(0)x)$ solves
$$\frac{\partial \tilde{h}(x,t)}{\partial t }=-\lambda F'(0)\frac{\partial \tilde{h}(x,t)}{\partial x }+ \frac{1}{2}\frac{\partial^{2} \tilde{h}(x,t)}{\partial x^{2}}+\eta(x,t).$$
The quadratic term is the first nontrivial contribution, and it is the only one kept. We arrive at the KPZ equation
$$\frac{\partial h(x,t)}{\partial t }=-\lambda\left(\frac{\partial h(x,t)}{\partial x }\right)^{2} + \frac{1}{2}\frac{\partial^{2} h(x,t)}{\partial x^{2}}+\eta(x,t).$$

== See also ==
- Fokker–Planck equation
- Fractal
- Quantum field theory
- Renormalization group
- Rough path
- Stochastic partial differential equation
- Surface growth
- Tracy–Widom distribution
- Universality (dynamical systems)

== Sources ==
1. Kardar, Mehran; Parisi, Giorgio; Zhang, Yi-Cheng (3 March 1986). "Dynamic Scaling of Growing Interfaces". Physical Review Letters. 56 (9): 889–892. Bibcode:1986PhRvL..56..889K. doi:10.1103/PhysRevLett.56.889. PMID 10033312.
2. Hairer, Martin; Quastel, J (2014), Weak universality of the KPZ equation (PDF)
3. Bertini, Lorenzo; Giacomin, Giambattista (1997). "Stochastic Burgers and KPZ equations from particle systems". Communications in Mathematical Physics. 183 (3): 571–607. Bibcode:1997CMaPh.183..571B. CiteSeerX 10.1.1.49.4105. doi:10.1007/s002200050044. S2CID 122139894.
4. Family, F.; Vicsek, T. (1985). "Scaling of the active zone in the Eden process on percolation networks and the ballistic deposition model". Journal of Physics A: Mathematical and General. 18 (2): L75–L81. Bibcode:1985JPhA...18L..75F. doi:10.1088/0305-4470/18/2/005.
5. Hairer, Martin (2013). "Solving the KPZ equation". Annals of Mathematics. 178 (2): 559–664. arXiv:1109.6811. doi:10.4007/annals.2013.178.2.4. S2CID 119247908.
6. Barna, Imre Ferenc; Bognár, Gabriella; Mohammed, Guedda; Hriczó, Krisztián; Mátyás, László (2020). "Analytic Self-Similar Solutions of the Kardar-Parisi-Zhang Interface Growing Equation with Various Noise Terms". Mathematical Modelling and Analysis. 25 (2): 241–257. arXiv:1904.01838. Bibcode:2019arXiv190401838F. doi:10.3846/mma.2020.10459. S2CID 102487227.
7. Tomohiro, Sasamoto (2016). "The 1D Kardar–Parisi–Zhang equation: height distribution and universality". Progress of Theoretical and Experimental Physics. 2016 (2) 022A01. §3.2. doi:10.1093/ptep/ptw002.
8. Quastel, Jeremy (2012). "Introduction to KPZ" (PDF). p. 3. Archived from the original (PDF) on 7 April 2025.
9. Quastel 2012, pp. 3, 6.
10. Timothy Halpin-Healy and Yi-Cheng Zhang (1995). "Kinetic roughening phenomena, stochastic growth, directed polymers and all that". Physics Reports, vol. 254: p. 236.
11. Tomohiro 2016, §4.
12. Quastel 2012, pp. 8-10. "The evidence for the Hopf-Cole solutions is now overwhelming. Whatever the physicists mean by KPZ, it is them....The problem is to find an appropriate definition [or interpretation] of (1)-(3) which fits that solution and to prove the corresponding uniqueness."
