= Arctic Circle (disambiguation) =

The Arctic Circle is one of the five major circles of latitude that mark maps of the Earth.

Arctic Circle may also refer to:

== Arts, entertainment, and media ==
- Arctic Circle (TV series), a Finnish-German television series
- "The Arctic Circle", the first track on the 2006 album He Poos Clouds by Owen Pallett
- Arctic Circle (comic), by Alex Hallatt

== Brands and enterprises ==
- Arctic Circle Air, an American airline based in Fairbanks, Alaska
- Arctic Circle Raceway, the biggest race track in Norway
- Arctic Circle Restaurants, a chain of burger and shake restaurants based in Midvale, Utah
- FC Santa Claus Arctic Circle, a Finnish football club who use Arctic Circle as part of their official name since 2012

== Other uses ==
- Arctic Circle (organization), an international non-profit organization related to Arctic issues based in Reykjavík, Iceland
- Arctic Circle, in the astronomy of the ancient Greeks was an observer-dependent circle on the celestial sphere, centred on the northern celestial pole and tangential to the horizon, within which all the northern circumpolar stars lie
- Arctic circle theorem, in mathematics
- Arctic Circle Trail, a trekking tour in West Greenland

== See also ==
- Antarctic
- Antarctic Circle
- Arctic
- Celestial sphere
- Equator
- North Pole
- Polar (disambiguation)
- Polar circle
- South Pole
- Temperate Zone
- Tropic of Cancer
- Tropic of Capricorn
