= Surface growth =

Dynamical study of growth of a surface

In mathematics and physics, surface growth refers to models used in the dynamical study of the growth of a surface, usually by means of a stochastic differential equation of a field.

== Examples ==
Popular growth models include:

- KPZ equation
- Dimer model
- Eden growth model
- SOS model
- Self-avoiding walk
- Abelian sandpile model
- Kuramoto–Sivashinsky equation (or the flame equation, for studying the surface of a flame front)

They are studied for their fractal properties, scaling behavior, critical exponents, universality classes, and relations to chaos theory, dynamical system, non-equilibrium / disordered / complex systems.

Popular tools include statistical mechanics, renormalization group, rough path theory, etc.

== Kinetic Monte Carlo surface growth model ==
Kinetic Monte Carlo (KMC) is a form of computer simulation in which atoms and molecules are allowed to interact at given rate that could be controlled based on known physics. This simulation method is typically used in the micro-electrical industry to study crystal surface growth, and it can provide accurate models surface morphology in different growth conditions on a time scales typically ranging from micro-seconds to hours. Experimental methods such as scanning electron microscopy (SEM), X-ray diffraction, and transmission electron microscopy (TEM), and other computer simulation methods such as molecular dynamics (MD), and Monte Carlo simulation (MC) are widely used.

=== How KMC surface growth works ===
==== 1. Absorption process ====
First, the model tries to predict where an atom would land on a surface and its rate at particular environmental conditions, such as temperature and vapor pressure. In order to land on a surface, atoms have to overcome the so-called activation energy barrier. The frequency of passing through the activation barrier can by calculated by the Arrhenius equation:

$A_{in} = A_{0,in}\exp \left(-\frac{E_{a,in}}{kT}\right)$

where A is the thermal frequency of molecular vibration, $E_{a}$ is the activation energy, k is the Boltzmann constant and T is the absolute temperature.

==== 2. Desorption process ====
When atoms land on a surface, there are two possibilities. First, they would diffuse on the surface and find other atoms to make a cluster, which will be discussed below. Second, they could come off of the surface or so-called desorption process. The desorption is described exactly as in the absorption process, with the exception of a different activation energy barrier.

$A_{out} = A_{0,out}\exp \left(-\frac{E_{a,out}}{kT}\right)$

For example, if all positions on the surface of the crystal are energy equivalent, the rate of growth can be calculated from Turnbull formula:

$V_c = hC_0(A_{out}-A_{0,out}) = hC_0\exp\left(-\frac{E_{a,in}}{kT}\right)\cdot\left(1-\exp\left(-\frac{\Delta G}{kT}\right)\right)$

where $V_{c}$ is the rate of growth, ∆G = E_{in} – E_{out}, A_{out}, A_{0 out} are frequencies to go in or out of crystal for any given molecule on the surface, h is the height of the molecule in the growth direction and C_{0} the concentration of the molecules in direct distance from the surface.

==== 3. Diffusion process on surface ====
Diffusion process can also be calculated with Arrhenius equation:

$D = D_0\exp \left(-\frac{E_d}{kT}\right)$

where D is the diffusion coefficient and E_{d} is diffusion activation energy.

All three processes strongly depend on surface morphology at a certain time. For example, atoms tend to lend at the edges of a group of connected atoms, the so-called island, rather than on a flat surface, this reduces the total energy. When atoms diffuse and connect to an island, each atom tends to diffuse no further, because activation energy to detach itself out of the island is much higher. Moreover, if an atom landed on top of an island, it would not diffuse fast enough, and the atom would tend to move down the steps and enlarge it.

=== Simulation methods ===
Because of limited computing power, specialized simulation models have been developed for various purposes depending on the time scale:

a) Electronic scale simulations (density function theory, ab-initio molecular dynamics): sub-atomic length scale in femto-second time scale

b) Atomic scale simulations (MD): nano to micro-meter length scale in nano-second time scale

c) Film scale simulation (KMC): micro-meter length scale in micro to hour time scale.

d) Reactor scale simulation (phase field model): meter length scale in year time scale.

Multiscale modeling techniques have also been developed to deal with overlapping time scales.

=== How to use growth conditions in KMC ===
The interest of growing a smooth and defect-free surface requires a combination set of physical conditions throughout the process. Such conditions are bond strength, temperature, surface-diffusion limited and supersaturation (or impingement) rate. Using KMC surface growth method, following pictures describe final surface structure at different conditions.

==== 1. Bond strength and temperature ====
Bond strength and temperature certainly play important roles in the crystal grow process. For high bond strength, when atoms land on a surface, they tend to be closed to atomic surface clusters, which reduce total energy. This behavior results in many isolated cluster formations with a variety of size yielding a rough surface. Temperature, on the other hand, controls the high of the energy barrier.

Conclusion: high bond strength and low temperature is preferred to grow a smoothed surface.

==== 2. Surface and bulk diffusion effect ====
Thermodynamically, a smooth surface is the lowest ever configuration, which has the smallest surface area. However, it requires a kinetic process such as surface and bulk diffusion to create a perfectly flat surface.

Conclusion: enhancing surface and bulk diffusion will help create a smoother surface.

==== 3. Supersaturation level ====
Conclusion: low impingement rate helps creating smoother surface.

==== 4. Morphology at different combination of conditions ====
With the control of all growth conditions such as temperature, bond strength, diffusion, and saturation level, desired morphology could be formed by choosing the right parameters. Following is the demonstration how to obtain some interesting surface features:

== See also ==
- Domino tiling
- Diffusion-limited growth
- Non-Euclidean surface growth
- Stochastic partial differential equation
