= Ranking theory =

Theory in epistemology

Ranking theory is a theory in formal epistemology that represents the agent's epistemic state by a ranking function. It could represent the qualitative and quantitative nature of belief.

== History ==
The theory was devised by the German philosopher, Wolfgang Spohn, and is discussed in his book, The Laws of Belief. Spohn explains how the ranking theory was born:

'Around 1980 Peter Gärdenfors’ papers on conditionals and belief change (1978, 1981) provided the best available account of conditional belief (besides Ellis 1979, which I was unaware of at that time), and this account appeared to offer more intelligible grounds for a theory of conditionals and causation than the similarity spheres used by David Lewis as a basis for those topics. However, I thought that Gärdenfors' account represented conditional beliefs and the dynamics of belief only in an incomplete way, too incomplete for the purposes of a theory of causation. For months I struggled to find a way of completing the account. Somehow the solution came to my mind in April 1982, and what was later called ranking theory was born.'

== Negative ranking function ==
A negative ranking function assigns an ordinal number to each member of the set of possibilities, the numbers show how much each world is far from the actual world from the agent's point of view. Let A be a complete algebra over W. Then κ is an A-measurable completely minimitive natural negative ranking function if and only if κ is a function from W into N+ = N or {∞} such that κ(∅) = ∞ κ(A) = min {κ(w) | w ∈A} for each nonempty A ∈A; κ(A) is called the negative rank of A.

One interpretation of k is that k is the degree of doubt.

== Two-sided ranking function ==
Let A be an algebra of propositions. Then τ is a two-sided ranking function for A if and only if there is a negative ranking function κ for A such that t(A) = κ(A) − κ(~A), for all A ∈A. t(A) is called the two-sided rank of A. Two-sided rank could be interpreted as the degree of belief. It could be positive or negative.

== Qualitative doxastic attitudes ==
The relationship between quantitative and qualitative doxastic attitudes in Ranking Theory works based on the neutrality threshold and it does not lead to the lottery paradox as it happens in Bayesian Epistemology. Let z be the neutrality threshold, then a proposition A is believed if and only if t(A)=>z; the proposition is suspended if and only if t(A)<z and t(A)<-z; and is disbelieved if and only if t(A)<=-z.
