= Rough path =

Concept in stochastic analysis

In stochastic analysis, a rough path is a generalization of the classical notion of a smooth path. It extends calculus and differential equation theory to handle irregular signals—paths that are too rough for traditional analysis, such as a Wiener process. This makes it possible to define and solve controlled differential equations of the form $\mathrm{d}y_t = f(y_t)\mathrm{d}x_t, \quad y_0 = a$ even when the driving path $x_t$ lacks classical differentiability. The theory was introduced in the 1990s by Terry Lyons.

Rough path theory captures how nonlinear systems interact with highly oscillatory or noisy input. It builds on the integration theory of L. C. Young, the geometric algebra of Kuo-Tsai Chen, and the Lipschitz function theory of Hassler Whitney, while remaining compatible with key ideas in stochastic calculus. The theory also extends Itô's theory of stochastic differential equations far beyond the semimartingale setting. Its definitions and uniform estimates form a robust framework that can recover classical results—such as the Wong–Zakai theorem, the Stroock–Varadhan support theorem, and the construction of stochastic flows—without relying on probabilistic properties like martingales or predictability.

A central concept in the theory is the Signature of a path: a noncommutative transform that encodes the path as a sequence of iterated integrals. Formally, it is a homomorphism from the monoid of paths (under concatenation) into the group-like elements of a tensor algebra. The Signature is faithful—it uniquely characterizes paths up to certain negligible modifications—making it a powerful tool for representing and comparing paths. These iterated integrals play a role similar to monomials in a Taylor expansion: they provide a coordinate system that captures the essential features of a path. Just as Taylor’s theorem allows a smooth function to be approximated locally by polynomials, the terms of the Signature offer a structured, hierarchical summary of a path’s behavior. This enriched representation forms the basis for defining a rough path and enables analysis without directly examining its fine-scale structure.

The theory has widespread applications across mathematics and applied fields. Notably, Martin Hairer used rough path techniques to help construct a solution theory for the KPZ equation, and later developed the more general theory of regularity structures, for which he was awarded the Fields Medal in 2014.

== Motivation ==
Rough path theory aims to make sense of the controlled differential equation

$$\mathrm{d} Y^i_t = \sum^d_{j=1} V^i_j(Y_t) \, \mathrm{d}X^j_t.$$

where the control, the continuous path $X_t$ taking values in a Banach space, need not be differentiable nor of bounded variation. A prevalent example of the controlled path $X_t$ is the sample path of a Wiener process. In this case, the aforementioned controlled differential equation can be interpreted as a stochastic differential equation and integration against "$\mathrm{d}X^{j}_t$" can be defined in the sense of Itô. However, Itô's calculus is defined in the sense of $L^{2}$ and is in particular not a pathwise definition. Rough paths give an almost sure pathwise definition of stochastic differential equations. The rough path notion of solution is well-posed in the sense that if $X(n)_t$ is a sequence of smooth paths converging to $X_t$ in the $p$-variation metric (described below), and

$$\mathrm{d} Y(n)^i_t = \sum^d_{j=1} V^i_j(Y_t) \, \mathrm{d}X(n)^j_t;$$
$$\mathrm{d} Y^i_t = \sum^d_{j=1} V^i_j(Y_t) \, \mathrm{d}X^j_t,$$

then $Y(n)$ converges to $Y$ in the $p$-variation metric. This continuity property and the deterministic nature of solutions makes it possible to simplify and strengthen many results in Stochastic Analysis, such as the Freidlin-Wentzell's Large Deviation theory as well as results about stochastic flows.

In fact, rough path theory can go far beyond the scope of Itô and Stratonovich calculus and allows to make sense of differential equations driven by non-semimartingale paths, such as Gaussian processes and Markov processes.

== Definition of a rough path ==
Rough paths are paths taking values in the truncated free tensor algebra (more precisely: in the free nilpotent group embedded in the free tensor algebra), which this section now briefly recalls. The tensor powers of $\mathbb{R}^{d}$, denoted $\big(\mathbb{R}^{d}\big)^{\otimes n}$, are equipped with the projective norm $\Vert \cdot \Vert$ (see Topological tensor product, note that rough path theory in fact works for a more general class of norms). Let $T^{(n)}(\mathbb{R}^{d})$ be the truncated tensor algebra

$T^{(n)}(\mathbb{R}^{d})=\bigoplus^{n}_{i=0}\big(\mathbb{R}^{d}\big)^{\otimes i},$ where by convention $(\mathbb{R}^d)^{\otimes 0}\cong\mathbb{R}$.

Let $\triangle_{0,1}$ be the simplex $\{(s,t):0\leq s\leq t \leq 1\}$. Let $p\geq 1$. Let $\mathbf{X}$ and $\mathbf{Y}$ be continuous maps $\triangle_{0,1}\to T^{(\lfloor p \rfloor)}(\mathbb{R}^{d})$. Let $\mathbf{X}^j$ denote the projection of $\mathbf{X}$ onto $j$-tensors and likewise for $\mathbf{Y}^{j}$. The $p$-variation metric is defined as

$$d_p \left(\mathbf{X},\mathbf{Y}\right):=\max_{j=1,\ldots,\lfloor p \rfloor} \sup_{0=t_0<t_1<\cdots <t_n=1} \left( \sum^{n-1}_{i=0}\Vert \mathbf{X}_{t_i,t_{i+1}}^j - \mathbf{Y}_{t_i,t_{i+1}}^j \Vert^{\frac{p}{j}} \right)^{\frac{j}{p}}$$

where the supremum is taken over all finite partitions $\{0=t_0<t_1<\cdots <t_n=1\}$ of $[0,1]$.

A continuous function $\mathbf{X}:\triangle_{0,1}\rightarrow T^{(\lfloor p \rfloor)}(\mathbb{R}^d)$ is a $p$-geometric rough path if there exists a sequence of paths with finite 1-variation (or, equivalently, of bounded variation) $X(1),X(2),\ldots$ such that

$$\mathbf{X}(n)_{s,t}= \left(1, \int_{s<s_1<t}\mathrm{d} X(n)_{s_1}, \ldots, \int_{s<s_1<\cdots<s_{\lfloor p \rfloor}<t} \, \mathrm{d}X(n)_{s_1} \otimes \cdots \otimes \mathrm{d} X(n)_{s_{\lfloor p \rfloor}}\right)$$

converges in the $p$-variation metric to $\mathbf{X}$ as $n\rightarrow \infty$.

== Universal limit theorem ==
A central result in rough path theory is Lyons' Universal Limit theorem. One (weak) version of the result is the following: Let $X(n)$ be a sequence of paths with finite total variation and let

$\mathbf{X}(n)_{s,t}= \left(1,\int_{s<s_1<t} \mathrm{d}X(n)_{s_1}, \ldots, \int_{s<s_1<\ldots<s_{\lfloor p \rfloor}<t} \mathrm{d} X(n)_{s_1}\otimes \cdots \otimes \mathrm{d} X(n)_{s_{\lfloor p \rfloor}}\right)$ denote the rough path lift of $X(n)$.

Suppose that $\mathbf{X}(n)$ converges in the $p$-variation metric to a $p$-geometric rough path $\mathbf{X}$ as $n\to \infty$. Let $(V^i_j)^{i=1, \ldots, n}_{j=1,\ldots,d}$ be functions that have at least $\lfloor p \rfloor$ bounded derivatives and the $\lfloor p \rfloor$-th derivatives are $\alpha$-Hölder continuous for some $\alpha > p-\lfloor p \rfloor$. Let $Y(n)$ be the solution to the differential equation

$$\mathrm{d} Y(n)^i_t = \sum^d_{j=1} V^i_j(Y(n)_t) \, \mathrm{d} X(n)^j_t$$

and let $\mathbf{Y}(n)$ be defined as

$$\mathbf{Y}(n)_{s,t}= \left(1, \int_{s<s_1<t} \, \mathrm{d} Y(n)_{s_1}, \ldots, \int_{s<s_1<\ldots<s_{\lfloor p \rfloor}<t} \mathrm{d} Y(n)_{s_1} \otimes \cdots \otimes \mathrm{d} Y(n)_{s_{\lfloor p \rfloor}} \right).$$

Then $\mathbf{Y}(n)$ converges in the $p$-variation metric to a $p$-geometric rough path $\mathbf{Y}$.

Moreover, $\mathbf{Y}$ is the solution to the differential equation

$$\mathrm{d} Y^i_t = \sum^d_{j=1} V^i_j(Y_t) \, \mathrm{d} X^j_t \qquad (\star)$$

driven by the geometric rough path $\mathbf{X}$.

The theorem can be interpreted as saying that the solution map (aka the Itô-Lyons map) $\Phi:G\Omega_p(\mathbb{R}^d)\to G\Omega_p(\mathbb{R}^e)$ of the RDE $(\star)$ is continuous (and in fact locally lipschitz) in the $p$-variation topology. Hence rough paths theory demonstrates that by viewing driving signals as rough paths, one has a robust solution theory for classical stochastic differential equations and beyond.

== Examples of rough paths ==
=== Brownian motion ===
Let $(B_t)_{t\geq 0}$ be a multidimensional standard Brownian motion. Let $\circ$ denote the Stratonovich integration. Then

$$\mathbf{B}_{s,t} = \left(1,\int_{s<s_1<t} \circ \mathrm{d} B_{s_1}, \int_{s<s_1<s_2<t} \circ \mathrm{d} B_{s_1} \otimes \circ \mathrm{d}B_{s_2}\right)$$

is a $p$-geometric rough path for any $2<p<3$. This geometric rough path is called the Stratonovich Brownian rough path.

=== Fractional Brownian motion ===
More generally, let $B_H(t)$ be a multidimensional fractional Brownian motion (a process whose coordinate components are independent fractional Brownian motions) with $H>\frac{1}{4}$. If $B^{m}_H(t)$ is the $m$-th dyadic piecewise linear interpolation of $B_H(t)$, then

$$\begin{align}
\mathbf{B}^m_H(s,t) = \left(1,\int_{s<s_1<t} \right. & \mathrm{d} B_H^ m(s_1), \int_{s<s_1<s_2<t} \, \mathrm{d} B_H^m(s_1) \otimes \mathrm{d} B_H^m(s_2), \\
& \left. \int_{s<s_1<s_2<s_3<t} \mathrm{d}B_H^m(s_1) \otimes \mathrm{d} B_H^m(s_2) \otimes \mathrm{d} B_H^m(s_3) \right)
\end{align}$$

converges almost surely in the $p$-variation metric to a $p$-geometric rough path for $\frac{1}{H}<p$. This limiting geometric rough path can be used to make sense of differential equations driven by fractional Brownian motion with Hurst parameter $H>\frac{1}{4}$. When $0<H\leq\frac{1}{4}$, it turns out that the above limit along dyadic approximations does not converge in $p$-variation. However, one can of course still make sense of differential equations provided one exhibits a rough path lift, existence of such a (non-unique) lift is a consequence of the Lyons–Victoir extension theorem.

=== Non-uniqueness of enhancement ===
In general, let $(X_t)_{t\geq0}$ be a $\mathbb{R}^d$-valued stochastic process. If one can construct, almost surely, functions $(s,t)\rightarrow \mathbf{X}^{j}_{s,t} \in \big(\mathbb{R}^d\big)^{\otimes j}$ so that

$$\mathbf{X}:(s,t)\rightarrow (1,X_t-X_s,\mathbf{X}^2_{s,t},\ldots,\mathbf{X}^{\lfloor p \rfloor}_{s,t})$$

is a $p$-geometric rough path, then $\mathbf{X}_{s,t}$ is an enhancement of the process $X$. Once an enhancement has been chosen, the machinery of rough path theory will allow one to make sense of the controlled differential equation

$$\mathrm{d} Y^i_t = \sum^d_{j=1} V^i_j(Y_t) \, \mathrm{d} X^j_t.$$

for sufficiently regular vector fields $V^i_j.$

Note that every stochastic process (even if it is a deterministic path) can have more than one (in fact, uncountably many) possible enhancements. Different enhancements will give rise to different solutions to the controlled differential equations. In particular, it is possible to enhance Brownian motion to a geometric rough path in a way other than the Brownian rough path. This implies that the Stratonovich calculus is not the only theory of stochastic calculus that satisfies the classical product rule

$$\mathrm{d}(X_t\cdot Y_t) = X_t \, \mathrm{d} Y_t+Y_t \, \mathrm{d} X_t.$$

In fact any enhancement of Brownian motion as a geometric rough path will give rise a calculus that satisfies this classical product rule. Itô calculus does not come directly from enhancing Brownian motion as a geometric rough path, but rather as a branched rough path.

== Applications in stochastic analysis ==
=== Stochastic differential equations driven by non-semimartingales ===
Rough path theory allows to give a pathwise notion of solution to (stochastic) differential equations of the form

$$\mathrm{d}Y_t = b(Y_t)\, \mathrm{d}t + \sigma(Y_t) \, \mathrm{d}X_t$$

provided that we can construct a rough path which is almost surely a rough path lift of the multidimensional stochastic process $X_t$ and that the drift $b$ and the volatility $\sigma$ are sufficiently smooth (see the section on the Universal Limit Theorem).

There are many examples of Markov processes, Gaussian processes, and other processes that can be enhanced as rough paths.

There are, in particular, many results on the solution to differential equation driven by fractional Brownian motion that have been proved using a combination of Malliavin calculus and rough path theory. In fact, it has been proved recently that the solution to controlled differential equation driven by a class of Gaussian processes, which includes fractional Brownian motion with Hurst parameter $H>\frac{1}{4}$, has a smooth density under the Hörmander's condition on the vector fields.

=== Freidlin–Wentzell's large deviation theory ===
Let $L(V,W)$ denote the space of bounded linear maps from a Banach space $V$ to another Banach space $W$.

Let $B_t$ be a $d$-dimensional standard Brownian motion. Let $b:\mathbb{R}^n\rightarrow \mathbb{R}^d$ and $\sigma:\mathbb{R}^n\rightarrow L(\mathbb{R}^d,\mathbb{R}^n)$ be twice-differentiable functions and whose second derivatives are $\alpha$-Hölder for some $\alpha>0$.

Let $X^{\varepsilon}$ be the unique solution to the stochastic differential equation

$$\mathrm{d}X^{\varepsilon} = b(X^{\epsilon}_t) \, \mathrm{d}t + \sqrt{\varepsilon} \sigma(X^\varepsilon) \circ \mathrm{d}B_t;\,X^{\varepsilon}=a,$$

where $\circ$ denotes Stratonovich integration.

The Freidlin Wentzell's large deviation theory aims to study the asymptotic behavior, as $\epsilon \rightarrow 0$, of $\mathbb{P}[X^\varepsilon \in F]$ for closed or open sets $F$ with respect to the uniform topology.

The Universal Limit Theorem guarantees that the Itô map sending the control path $(t,\sqrt{\varepsilon}B_t)$ to the solution $X^\varepsilon$ is a continuous map from the $p$-variation topology to the $p$-variation topology (and hence the uniform topology). Therefore, the Contraction principle in large deviations theory reduces Freidlin–Wentzell's problem to demonstrating the large deviation principle for $(t,\sqrt{\varepsilon}B_t)$ in the $p$-variation topology.

This strategy can be applied to not just differential equations driven by the Brownian motion but also to the differential equations driven any stochastic processes which can be enhanced as rough paths, such as fractional Brownian motion.

=== Stochastic flow ===
Once again, let $B_t$ be a $d$-dimensional Brownian motion. Assume that the drift term $b$ and the volatility term $\sigma$ has sufficient regularity so that the stochastic differential equation

$$\mathrm{d}\phi_{s,t}(x) = b(\phi_{s,t}(x)) \, \mathrm{d}t + \sigma{(\phi_{s,t}(x))} \, \mathrm{d}B_t; X_s=x$$

has a unique solution in the sense of rough path. A basic question in the theory of stochastic flow is whether the flow map $\phi_{s,t}(x)$ exists and satisfy the cocyclic property that for all $s\leq u\leq t$,

$$\phi_{u,t}(\phi_{s,u}(x))=\phi_{s,t}(x)$$

outside a null set independent of $s,u,t$.

The Universal Limit Theorem once again reduces this problem to whether the Brownian rough path $\mathbf{B_{s,t}}$ exists and satisfies the multiplicative property that for all $s\leq u \leq t$,

$$\mathbf{B}_{s,u} \otimes \mathbf{B}_{u,t} = \mathbf{B}_{s,t}$$

outside a null set independent of $s$, $u$ and $t$.

In fact, rough path theory gives the existence and uniqueness of $\phi_{s,t}(x)$ not only outside a null set independent of $s$,$t$ and $x$ but also of the drift $b$ and the volatility $\sigma$.

As in the case of Freidlin–Wentzell theory, this strategy holds not just for differential equations driven by the Brownian motion but to any stochastic processes that can be enhanced as rough paths.

== Controlled rough path ==
Controlled rough paths, introduced by M. Gubinelli, are paths $\mathbf{Y}$ for which the rough integral

$$\int_s^t \mathbf{Y}_u \, \mathrm{d}X_u$$

can be defined for a given geometric rough path $X$.

More precisely, let $L(V,W)$ denote the space of bounded linear maps from a Banach space $V$ to another Banach space $W$.

Given a $p$-geometric rough path

$$\mathbf{X} = (1,\mathbf{X}^1, \ldots, \mathbf{X}^{\lfloor p \rfloor})$$

on $\mathbb{R}^{d}$, a $\gamma$-controlled path is a function $\mathbf{Y}_s =(\mathbf{Y}^0_s,\mathbf{Y}^1_s, \ldots, \mathbf{Y}^{\lfloor \gamma \rfloor}_{s})$ such that $\mathbf{Y}^j:[0,1] \rightarrow L((\mathbb{R}^d)^{\otimes j+1}, \mathbb{R}^n)$ and that there exists $M>0$ such that for all $0\leq s\leq t\leq 1$ and $j=0,1,\ldots,\lfloor \gamma \rfloor$,

$$\Vert \mathbf{Y}^{j}_s \Vert\leq M$$

and

$$\left\| \mathbf{Y}^j_t - \sum_{i=0}^{\lfloor \gamma \rfloor-j} \mathbf{Y}_s^{j+i} \mathbf{X}^i_{s,t} \right\| \leq M|t-s|^{\frac{\gamma-j}{p}}.$$

=== Example: Lip(γ) function ===
Let $\mathbf{X}=(1,\mathbf{X}^{1},\ldots,\mathbf{X}^{\lfloor p \rfloor})$ be a $p$-geometric rough path satisfying the Hölder condition that there exists $M>0$, for all $0\leq s\leq t \leq 1$ and all $j=1,,2,\ldots,\lfloor p \rfloor$,

$$\Vert \mathbf{X}^j_{s,t} \Vert \leq M(t-s)^{\frac{j}{p}},$$

where $\mathbf{X}^j$ denotes the $j$-th tensor component of $\mathbf{X}$. Let $\gamma\geq 1$. Let $f:\mathbb{R}^{d}\rightarrow \mathbb{R}^{n}$ be an $\lfloor \gamma \rfloor$-times differentiable function and the $\lfloor \gamma \rfloor$-th derivative is $\gamma - \lfloor \gamma \rfloor$ Hölder, then

$$(f(\mathbf{X}^1_s),Df(\mathbf{X}^1_s),\ldots,D^{\lfloor \gamma \rfloor} f(\mathbf{X}^1_s))$$

is a $\gamma$-controlled path.

=== Integral of a controlled path is a controlled path ===
If $\mathbf{Y}$ is a $\gamma$-controlled path where $\gamma>p-1$, then

$$\int_s^t \mathbf{Y}_u \, \mathrm{d}X_u$$

is defined and the path

$$\left( \int_s^t \mathbf{Y}_u \, \mathrm{d}X_u, \mathbf{Y}^0_s, \mathbf{Y}^1_s, \ldots, \mathbf{Y}^{\lfloor \gamma-1 \rfloor}_s \right)$$

is a $\gamma$-controlled path.

=== Solution to controlled differential equation is a controlled path ===
Let $V:\mathbb{R}^n \rightarrow L(\mathbb{R}^d,\mathbb{R}^n)$ be functions that has at least $\lfloor \gamma \rfloor$ derivatives and the $\lfloor \gamma \rfloor$-th derivatives are $\gamma-\lfloor \gamma \rfloor$-Hölder continuous for some $\gamma > p$. Let $Y$ be the solution to the differential equation

$$\mathrm{d} Y_t = V(Y_t) \, \mathrm{d}X_t .$$

Define

$$\frac{\mathrm{d}Y}{\mathrm{d}X}(\cdot)=V(\cdot);$$

$$\frac{\mathrm{d}^{r+1}Y} {\mathrm{d}^{r+1}X}(\cdot) = D \left( \frac{\mathrm{d}^r Y}{\mathrm{d}^r X} \right) (\cdot) V(\cdot),$$

where $D$ denotes the derivative operator, then

$$\left(Y_t, \frac{\mathrm{d}Y}{\mathrm{d}X}(Y_t), \frac{\mathrm{d}^2Y}{\mathrm{d}^2X}(Y_t), \ldots, \frac{\mathrm{d}^{\lfloor \gamma \rfloor}Y}{\mathrm{d}^{\lfloor \gamma \rfloor}X}(Y_t)\right)$$

is a $\gamma$-controlled path.

== Signature ==
Let $X:[0,1]\rightarrow \mathbb{R}^{d}$ be a continuous function with finite total variation. Define

$$S(X)_{s,t}= \left( 1,\int_{s<s_1<t} \mathrm{d}X_{s_1},\int_{s<s_1<s_2<t} \mathrm{d}X_{s_1} \otimes \mathrm{d}X_{s_2}, \ldots, \int_{s<s_1<\cdots<s_n<t} \mathrm{d}X_{s_1} \otimes \cdots \otimes\mathrm{d} X_{s_n},\ldots\right).$$

The signature of a path is defined to be $S(X)_{0,1}$.

The signature can also be defined for geometric rough paths. Let $\mathbf{X}$ be a geometric rough path and let $\mathbf{X}(n)$ be a sequence of paths with finite total variation such that

$$\mathbf{X}(n)_{s,t}= \left(1, \int_{s<s_1<t} \, \mathrm{d}X(n)_{s_1}, \ldots, \int_{s<s_1<\cdots<s_{\lfloor p \rfloor}<t} \, \mathrm{d} X(n)_{s_1} \otimes \cdots \otimes \mathrm{d} X(n)_{s_{\lfloor p \rfloor}}\right).$$

converges in the $p$-variation metric to $\mathbf{X}$. Then

$$\int_{s<s_1<\cdots<s_{N}<t} \, \mathrm{d}X(n)_{s_1}\otimes \cdots \otimes \mathrm{d}X(n)_{s_N}$$

converges as $n\rightarrow \infty$ for each $N$. The signature of the geometric rough path $\mathbf{X}$ can be defined as the limit of $S(X(n))_{s,t}$ as $n\rightarrow \infty$.

The signature satisfies Chen's identity, that

$$S(\mathbf{X})_{s,u}\otimes S(\mathbf{X})_{u,t}=S(\mathbf{X})_{s,t}$$

for all $s \leq u \leq t$.

=== Kernel of the signature transform ===
The set of paths whose signature is the trivial sequence, or more precisely,

$$S(\mathbf{X})_{0,1} = (1,0,0,\ldots)$$

can be completely characterized using the idea of tree-like path.

A $p$-geometric rough path is tree-like if there exists a continuous function $h:[0,1]\rightarrow [0,\infty)$ such that $h(0)=h(1)=0$ and for all $j=1,\ldots,\lfloor p \rfloor$ and all $0\leq s \leq t\leq 1$,

$$\Vert \mathbf{X}^j_{s,t} \Vert^p \leq h(t)+h(s)-2\inf_{u\in [s,t]}h(u)$$

where $\mathbf{X}^{j}$ denotes the $j$-th tensor component of $\mathbf{X}$.

A geometric rough path $\mathbf{X}$ satisfies $S(\mathbf{X})_{0,1}=(1,0,\ldots)$ if and only if $\mathbf{X}$ is tree-like.

Given the signature of a path, it is possible to reconstruct the unique path that has no tree-like pieces.

== Infinite dimensions ==
It is also possible to extend the core results in rough path theory to infinite dimensions, providing that the norm on the tensor algebra satisfies certain admissibility condition.
