= Mehran Kardar =

Iranian-American physicist

- Born: August 1957 (age 69)
- Education: King's College, Cambridge (BA, MA); Massachusetts Institute of Technology (PhD)
- Known for: Kardar–Parisi–Zhang equation
- Scientific career
- Fields: Statistical physics
- Doctoral advisor: Nihat Berker

Mehran Kardar (Persian: مهران کاردر; born August 1957) is an Iranian-American physicist and professor of physics at the Massachusetts Institute of Technology (MIT), and co-faculty at the New England Complex Systems Institute (USA). He received his B.A. in physics from the University of Cambridge in 1979, and obtained his Ph.D. from MIT in 1983. Kardar is particularly known for the Kardar–Parisi–Zhang (KPZ) equation in theoretical physics, which has been named after him and his two coauthors: the Nobel Prize laureate Giorgio Parisi, and Yi-Cheng Zhang. He was awarded a Guggenheim Fellowship in 2001.

== Awards ==
- 1976–78 Exhibition – Senior Scholarship at King's College, Cambridge University
- 1978–79 Prizes based on performance in undergraduate (Tripos) exams
- 1981–82 IBM Predoctoral Fellowship
- 1983–86 Junior Fellowship, Harvard Society of Fellows
- 1987–91 A. P. Sloan Fellowship
- 1988 Fellow of Ashdown House (Graduate Dormitory), MIT
- 1988 Bergmann Memorial Research Award
- 1989 Presidential Young Investigator Award
- 1990 Graduate Student Departmental Teaching Award
- 1990–92 MIT Class of 1948 Professor (Career Development Chair)
- 1991 Edgerton Award for Junior Faculty Achievements at MIT
- 1992 The Beuchner Teaching Prize, Physics Department
- 1993 School of Science Prize in Graduate Teaching
- 2001 John Simon Guggenheim Fellowship
- 2007 Fellow, American Physical Society
- 2008 School of Science Prize in Graduate Teaching
- 2009 APS Outstanding Referee
- 2009 Elected Fellow of the American Academy of Arts and Sciences
- 2011 Francis Freidman Professor, Physics Department, MIT
- 2018 Elected member of the National Academy of Sciences
- 2020 Simons Fellow in Mathematics and Theoretical Physics
- 2025 the IUPAP Boltzmann Medal
- 2026 Lars Onsager Prize, American Physical Society

== Courses at MIT OpenCourseWare ==
His following courses are currently available on MIT OCW.

- Statistical Physics in Biology
- Statistical Mechanics I: Statistical Mechanics of Particles
- Statistical Mechanics II: Statistical Physics of Fields

== Bibliography ==
=== Books ===
- Statistical Physics of Fields. University of Cambridge Press, 2007. ISBN 978-0-521-87341-3,
- Statistical Physics of Particles. University of Cambridge Press, 2007. ISBN 978-0-521-87342-0,

and of about 200 scientific papers
