= Statistical Physics of Particles =

2007 textbook series by Mehran Kardar

- Author: Mehran Kardar
- Publisher: Cambridge University Press
- Publication date: 2007
- ISBN: 978-0-521-87342-0

Statistical Physics of Particles and Statistical Physics of Fields are a two-volume series of textbooks by Mehran Kardar. Each book is based on a semester-long course taught by Kardar at the Massachusetts Institute of Technology. They cover statistical physics and thermodynamics at the graduate level.

== Editions ==
- Kardar, Mehran (2007). Statistical Physics of Particles. Cambridge University Press. ISBN 978-0-521-87342-0. OCLC 860391091.
- Kardar, Mehran (2007). Statistical Physics of Fields. Cambridge University Press. ISBN 978-0-521-87341-3. OCLC 920137477.
