= Wallis Professor of Mathematics =

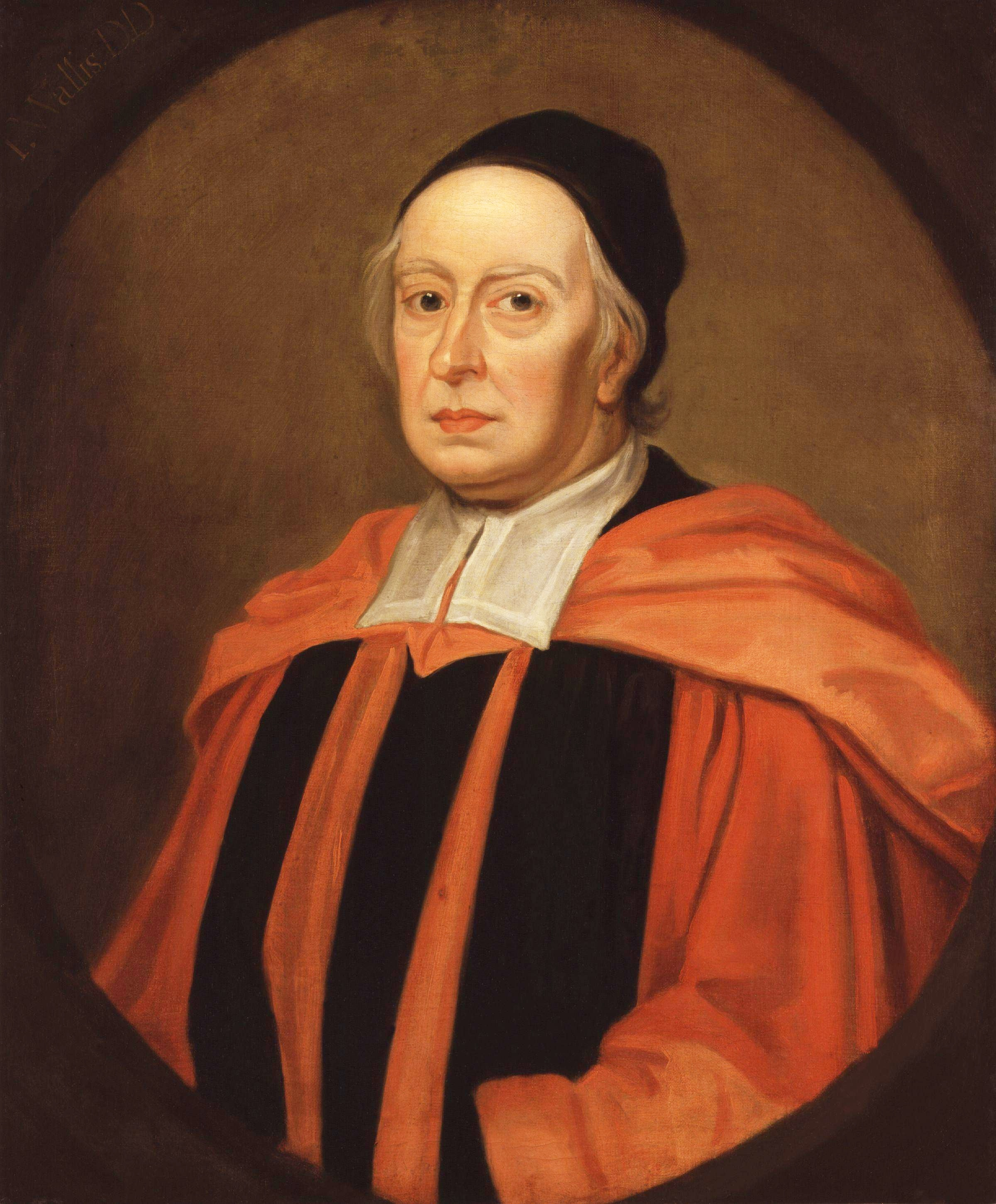
John Wallis

The Wallis Professorship of Mathematics is a chair in the Mathematical Institute of the University of Oxford. It was established in 1969 in honour of John Wallis, who was Savilian Professor of Geometry at Oxford from 1649 to 1703.

== List of Wallis Professors of Mathematics ==
- 1969 to 1985: John Kingman
- 1985 to 1997: Simon Donaldson
- 1999 to 2022: Terence Lyons
- 2022 to date: Massimiliano Gubinelli

== See also ==
- List of professorships at the University of Oxford
