= Jeremy Quastel =

Canadian mathematician (born 1963)

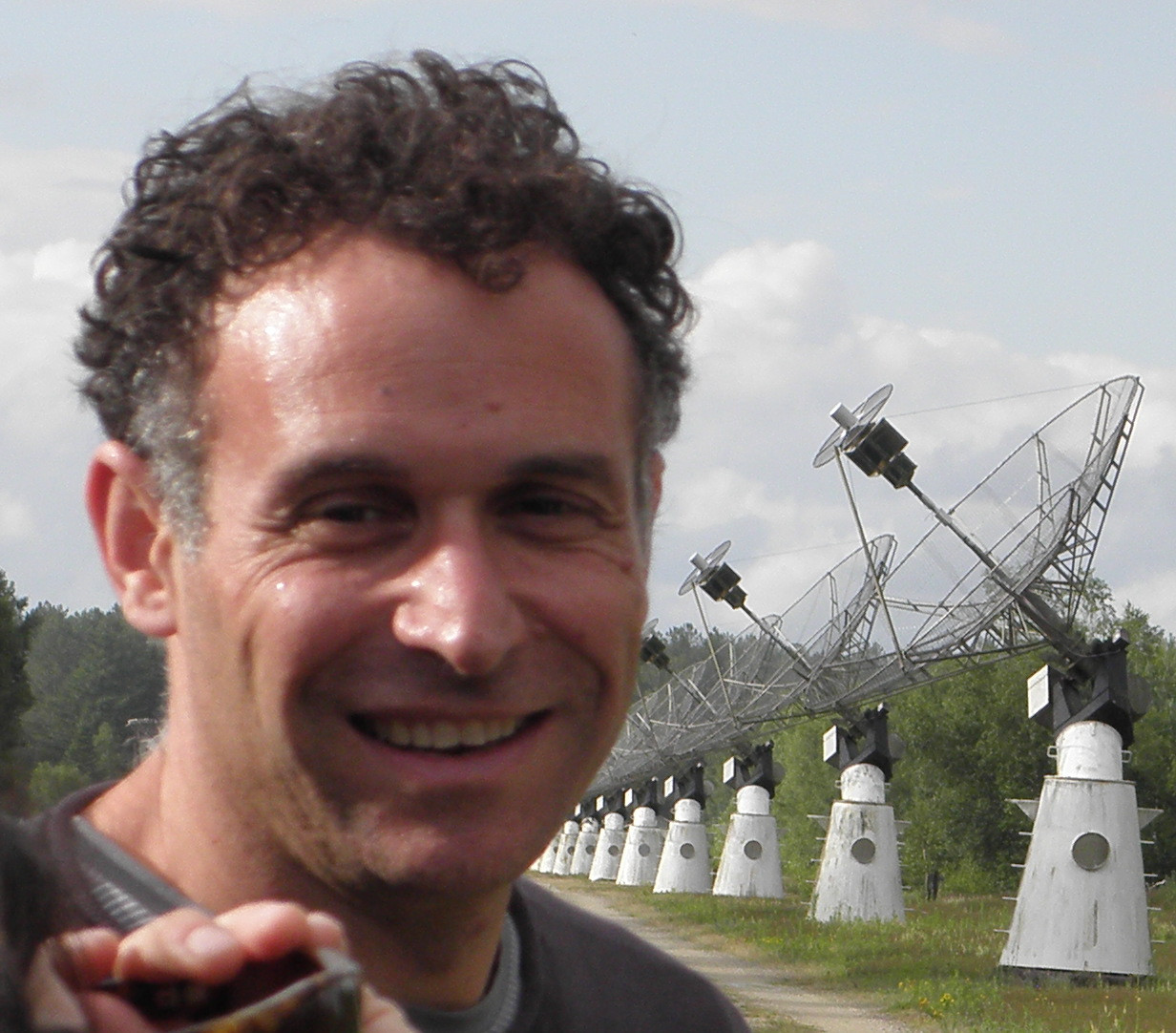
- Quastel at Nançay Radio Observatory in 2012
- Born: December 20, 1963 (age 62); Canada
- Education: New York University (PhD)
- Children: 2
- Awards: Fellow of the Royal Society of Canada 2016; CRM-Fields-PIMS Prize 2018; Jeffery–Williams Prize 2019; Fellow of the Royal Society 2021
- Scientific career
- Fields: Mathematics
- Workplaces: University of Toronto; UC Davis
- Thesis: Diffusion of colour in the simple exclusion process (1990)
- Doctoral advisor: S. R. Srinivasa Varadhan

Jeremy Daniel Quastel FRS, FRSC is a Canadian mathematician specializing in probability theory, stochastic processes and partial differential equations. He currently University Professor at the University of Toronto, and previously served as department head from 2017 until 2021..

== Career ==
Quastel grew up in Vancouver, British Columbia. He earned his PhD at Courant Institute of Mathematical Sciences at New York University in 1990; his advisor was S. R. Srinivasa Varadhan. He was a postdoc at the Mathematical Sciences Research Institute in Berkeley, then a faculty member at the University of California, Davis for the next six years. He returned to Canada in 1998.

== Research ==
Quastel is recognized as one of the top probabilists in the world in the fields of hydrodynamic theory, stochastic partial differential equations, and integrable probability. In particular, his research is on the large scale behaviour of interacting particle systems and stochastic partial differential equations. Together with Konstantin Matetski and Daniel Remenik, Quastel gave an exact formulation of the KPZ fixed point in terms of its transition probabilities.

== Awards, distinctions, and recognitions ==
- Natural Sciences and Engineering Research Council (NSERC) John C. Polanyi Award (2025)
- Fellow of the Royal Society (2021)
- CMS Jeffery–Williams Prize (2019)
- CRM-Fields-PIMS prize (2018)
- Royal Society of Canada Fellow (2016)
- Killam Research Fellowship (2013) for his research of stochastic processes and partial differential equations used to describe natural processes of change and evolution
- invited speaker at the Current Developments in Mathematics (2011)
- invited speaker at the International Congress of Mathematicians in Hyderabad (2010)
- Sloan Fellow (1996–98)

== Family ==
Jeremy Quastel is the grandson of biochemist Juda Hirsch Quastel.
