= Herbert Spohn =

German mathematician

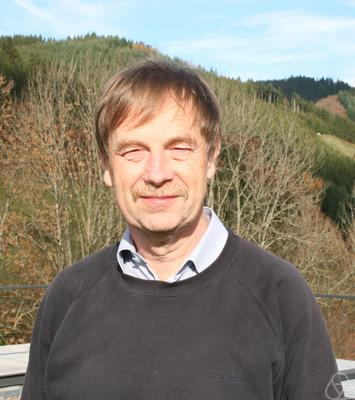
Spohn at Oberwolfach, 2010

Herbert Spohn (born 1 November 1946) is a German mathematician and mathematical physicist working in kinetic equations, dynamics of stochastic particle systems, hydrodynamic limit, kinetics of growth processes, disordered systems, open quantum systems, dynamics of charged particles coupled to their radiation field, Schrödinger operators, functional integration and stochastic analysis.

His PhD was obtained in 1975 at LMU Munich under the supervision of Georg Süßmann.

He is currently (in the year 2021) Emeritus Professor of the Department of Mathematics of the Technical University of Munich.

He obtained several prizes. In 2011, he was awarded the Dannie Heineman Prize for Mathematical Physics, the Leonard Eisenbud Prize for Mathematics and Physics (AMS) and the Premio Caterina Tomassoni e Felice Pietro Chisesi Prize of University of Roma "La Sapienza". He is Docteur Honoris Causa de L'Université Paris-Dauphine. In 2017, he received the Max Planck Medal of the German Physical Society, in 2019, the Boltzmann Medal of the International Union of Pure and Applied Physics.

He wrote the books Large Scale Dynamics of Interacting Particles (Springer, 1991) and Dynamics of Charged Particles and Their Radiation Field (Cambridge University Press, 2004).

He gave an invited talk at the International Congress of Mathematicians in 2010, on the topic of "Mathematical Physics".

Spohn is the brother of the historical sociologist Willfried Spohn and of the analytic philosopher Wolfgang Spohn.

Together with Michael Prähofer he introduced the Airy process.
