= Juda Hirsch Quastel =

Canadian biochemist (1899–1987)

Juda Hirsch Quastel FRS, FRSE
- Born: October 2, 1899; Sheffield, England
- Died: October 15, 1987 (aged 88); Vancouver, British Columbia, Canada
- Education: Imperial College London; University of Cambridge
- Awards: Order of Canada; Flavelle Medal (1974)
- Scientific career
- Fields: Biochemistry
- Institutions: Cardiff Mental Hospital; Agricultural and Food Research Council; McGill University-Montreal General Hospital Research Institute
- Doctoral advisor: Frederick Gowland Hopkins

Juda Hirsch Quastel, CC FRSC FRS FRSE (October 2, 1899 – October 15, 1987) was a British-Canadian biochemist who pioneered diverse research in neurochemistry, soil metabolism, cellular metabolism, and cancer.

== Biography ==
Quastel, also known as "Harry" or "Q," was born at Ecclesall Road in Sheffield the son of Jonas Quastel, a confectioner, and his wife, Flora Itcovitz. His parents had come to Britain in 1897 from Tarnopol in Galicia (Eastern Europe) and were married in Britain. He was named after his grandfather, Juda Quastel, a chemist in Tarnapol.

He was educated at Sheffield Central Secondary School. In the First World War, he served with the British Army as a Laboratory Assistant at St George's Hospital from 1917 to 1919.

Electing to study chemistry, Quastel received a baccalaureate from Imperial College London in 1921. Pursuing graduate work at the University of Cambridge, Quastel studied with Frederick Gowland Hopkins, the leading figure in British biochemistry and a future Nobel Prize recipient for his work on the nutritional importance of vitamins. Under Hopkins, Quastel received a Doctor of Philosophy degree from the University of Cambridge in biochemistry in 1924 and, not long after, was made a Fellow of Trinity College, Cambridge.

Quastel remained in Hopkins’ department as a demonstrator and lecturer from 1923 to 1929, during which he pioneered the research of microbial enzymology. He obtained a doctorate of science from Cambridge in 1926 and received a Beit Memorial Fellowship in 1928.

Quastel accepted a position as director of research at the Cardiff City Mental Hospital in 1930. From this location, he was able to conduct early work on the enzymology and metabolism of the brain. For these studies, Quastel was made a Fellow of the Royal Society of London in 1940.

In 1941, when Britain's wartime food supply emerged as a strategic concern, the Agricultural Research Council (ARC) asked Quastel to lead a new research unit focused on improving crop yield at the Rothamsted Experimental Station. By analyzing soil as a dynamic system, rather than an inert substance, he was able to apply techniques such as perfusion, with which he had become familiar in studies of animal organs. On this approach, Quastel later wrote (1946) that "soil as a whole can be considered an organ comparable in some respects to a liver or a gland to which may be added various nutrients, pure or complex degraded plant materials, rain, air, and in which enzymatic reactions can occur."

Using these techniques, Quastel was able to quantify the influence of various plant hormones, inhibitors and other chemicals on the activity of microorganisms in the soil and assess their direct impact on plant growth. While the full work of the unit remained secret, certain discoveries were developed for commercial use after the war. Best known is the compound commonly labeled as 2,4-D, one of the first systemic or hormone herbicides, a class of chemicals responsible for triggering a worldwide revolution in agricultural output and still the most widely used weed-killer in the world. Another invention was developed as a soil conditioner and is marketed by Monsanto Company under the trade name Krilium.

After World War II, Quastel was invited to become assistant director of the newly founded McGill University-Montreal General Hospital Research Institute and professor of biochemistry at McGill University, and, in 1947, he accepted the invitation. The following year, he was appointed director of the institute.

During his nineteen years at McGill, Quastel supervised seventy PhD candidates and his Institute published over three hundred scientific papers on topics including metabolism of micro-organisms, soil biochemistry, neurobiochemistry, neurotropic drugs, anaesthesia, cancer biochemistry, enzyme inhibition, and transport of nutrients and ions across membranes. Once he reached McGill's retirement age in 1966, Quastel accepted a professorship of neurochemistry at the University of British Columbia in the Department of Psychiatry, the first such position for that institution.

Quastel received many honors, including, in 1970, Canada's highest recognition, the Companionship of the Order of Canada. In the same year, he received an honorary doctorate from the Hebrew University in Jerusalem, of which he had also been a governor since 1950. He received an honorary Doctorate of Science from McGill University in 1969. He was made an honorary Fellow of the Royal Society of Edinburgh in 1983.

He died in Vancouver on 16 October 1987.

== Family ==
In 1931 Quastel married Henrietta Jungmann and they had three children—Michael, David and Barbara. Following her death in 1973 he married again in 1975 to Susan Ricardo.

He had eleven grandchildren including mathematician Jeremy Quastel.

== Publications ==
- Chemistry of the Brain (1937)
- The Mechanism of Enzyme Action (1940)
- The Influence of Biochemistry in Modern Life (1956)
- The Chemistry of Brain Metabolism in Health and Disease (1961)
- Metabolic Inhibitors (1973)
