= Nihat Berker =

Turkish scientist, theoretical chemist (born 1949)

Ahmet Nihat Berker
- Born: 20 September 1949 (age 76); Istanbul, Turkey
- Citizenship: Turkey, United States
- Education: Massachusetts Institute of Technology
- Known for: Renormalization group, Critical phenomena, Phase Transitions
- Spouse: Bedia Erim Berker
- Children: Selim Berker, Ratip Emin Berker
- Awards: Humboldt Research Award (2007); Rector, Sabancı University (2009–); Academia Europaea, Member (2011)
- Scientific career
- Fields: Applied and Soft matter physics, Statistical mechanics and Condensed matter physics
- Workplaces: Massachusetts Institute of Technology; University of Illinois at Urbana–Champaign; Harvard University; Technical University of Istanbul; Sabancı University; Kadir Has University
- Thesis: Phase Transitions and Critical Phenomena: Universality and Global Multicritical Phase Diagrams from Position-Space Renormalization-Group Studies
- Notable students: Mehran Kardar

Ahmet Nihat Berker (born 20 September 1949) is a Turkish scientist, theoretical chemist, physicist and emeritus professor of physics at MIT. Currently, he is the acting dean of Engineering and Natural Sciences in Kadir Has University, Turkey. He is the son of a notable scientist and engineer, Ratip Berker. His wife, Bedia Erim Berker, is a professor of chemistry at Istanbul Technical University, and one of his sons, Selim Berker, is a professor of epistemology in the department of philosophy at Harvard University.

== Academic life ==
After graduating from Robert College at first place in 1967, Berker received B.S. degrees in physics and chemistry from the Massachusetts Institute of Technology (MIT) in 1971. He received his M.S. and PhD degrees in physics from the University of Illinois at Urbana–Champaign in 1972 and 1977, respectively. During 1977–79, he was a postdoctoral research fellow in the department of physics at Harvard University. He was an assistant professor during 1979–82, associate professor during 1982–1988, and professor of theoretical physics during 1988–04 at MIT. From 1999 to 2004, he served as a professor and dean of the School of Sciences and Letters at the Istanbul Technical University. After losing the president (rector) elections in İTÜ, he left the Technical University of Istanbul for a professor position at Koç University. He became emeritus professor of physics at MIT in 2004. He was an adjunct professor at Boğaziçi University in Bebek, Istanbul, between 1996 and 2004, as well. During 2005–2009, he served as a professor of physics at Koç University in Istanbul. From 2009 until his resignation on 11 September 2016, he was the president of Sabancı University in Tuzla, Istanbul. Currently, he is the acting dean of the faculty of engineering and natural sciences at Kadir Has University.

=== Research areas ===
Nihat Berker is best known for his research in statistical mechanics, especially on phase transitions applying renormalization group theory, with applications to surface physics and materials with defects.
