= Oxford-Man Institute of Quantitative Finance =

UK academic institution

Coordinates: 51.7615°N 1.270°W

Oxford-Man Institute
- Established: 2007
- Affiliations: University of Oxford
- Location: Oxford, England
- Research Director: Professor Álvaro Cartea
- Website: www.oxford-man.ox.ac.uk

The Oxford-Man Institute of Quantitative Finance is an interdisciplinary research institute of the University of Oxford, England. The institute was co-founded in June 2007 with Man Group plc. It brings together faculty, post-docs and students throughout the university interested in research into the quantitative finance applications of machine learning and data analytics.

== Faculty ==
The current director of the Oxford-Man Institute is Álvaro Cartea, a Professor of Mathematical Finance at Oxford University, where he is a member of the Mathematical and Computational Finance Group. Álvaro is a founding member and deputy chairman of the Commodities & Energy Markets Association (CEMA). The founding director of OMI was Professor Neil Shephard, who served from 2007 to 2011. Terry Lyons served as director from 2011 to 2015.. Stephen Roberts served as director from 2015 to 2021.

Departments of the university currently represented in the membership of the institute include the Computing Lab, Economics, Engineering Science, the Mathematical Institute, Said Business School and Statistics.

The institute is based at Eagle House, on the former Lucy's Ironworks site in Walton Well Road, Jericho. Man Group's research laboratory is based in the building and its staff work with OMI researchers to share expertise and identify areas for future investigation.

== Funding ==
In June 2007, Man Group Plc announced it would provide £10.45M to the university to cover the core costs of the Institute for its first five years. In July 2007, Man Group gave the university £3.3M to permanently endow the Man Professor of Quantitative Finance.
