= Non-Euclidean surface growth =

In the field of surface growth, there are growth processes that result in the surface of an object changing shape over time. As the object grows, its surface may change from flat to curved, or change curvature. Two points on the surface may also change in distance as a result of deformations of the object or accretion of new matter onto the object. The shape of the surface and its changes can be described in terms of non-Euclidean geometry and in particular, Riemannian geometry with a space- and time-dependent curvature.

Examples of non-Euclidean surface growth are found in the mechanics of growing gravitational bodies, propagating fronts of phase transitions, epitaxial growth of nanostructures and additive 3D printing, growth of plants, and cell motility
