= Wolfgang Spohn =

German philosopher (born 1950)

Wolfgang Konrad Spohn (born 20 March 1950, in Tübingen) is a German philosopher. He is professor emeritus of philosophy and philosophy of science at the University of Konstanz.

== Biography ==
Wolfgang Spohn studied philosophy, logic and philosophy of science and mathematics at LMU Munich and acquired there the MA (1973) and the PhD (1976) with a thesis on the Grundlagen der Entscheidungstheorie. In his time as an assistant professor, he earned the habilitation (1984) with a thesis about Eine Theorie der Kausalität. He held professorships at the University of Regensburg (1986–91), Bielefeld University (1991–96), and the University of Konstanz (1996–2018). From 2019 to 2025, he was a senior professor at the University of Tübingen.

Spohn is editor of the philosophical journal Erkenntnis and was its editor-in-chief from 1988 to 2001. He is a founding member of the Gesellschaft für Analytische Philosophie and was its vice-president from 2006 to 2012. He was a Fellow at the Wissenschaftskolleg zu Berlin (1985/86) and a Distinguished Visiting Professor at the University of California, Irvine (1988). Since 2002, he is a member of the Deutsche Akademie der Naturforscher Leopoldina and since 2015 a member of the Academia Europaea. In 2012, he was the first outside Anglosaxon academia to win the Lakatos Award of the London School of Economics for his book The Laws of Belief. Ranking Theory and its Philosophical Applications. In 2015, he received the Frege Prize of the Gesellschaft für Analytische Philosophie for outstanding achievements of a German-speaking philosopher in the field of analytic philosophy. In 2023, he received an honorary doctorate from LMU Munich.

Spohn was speaker of two DFG Research Units Logic in Philosophy (1997–2003) and What if? (2012–2018), PI of the Collaborative Research Center 471 Variation in the Lexicon (2000–2008) und co-initiator of the DFG Priority Program SPP 1516 New Frameworks of Rationality (2011–2018), from which the interdisciplinary, philosophical-psychological Handbook of Rationality (MIT Press 2021), co-edited with Markus Knauff, emerged. He was a member of the Excellence Cluster EXC 2064 Machine Learning: New Perspectives for Science from 2019 to 2025, and since 2020 he has been directing his Reinhart Koselleck Project Reflexive Decision and Game Theory.

Spohn is the youngest brother of the historical sociologist Willfried Spohn and of the mathematical physicist Herbert Spohn.

== Research ==
Spohn's work is particularly associated with his contributions to formal epistemology, in particular for comprehensively developing ranking theory since 1982, which is his theory of the dynamics of belief. It is an alternative to probability theory and has similarly great philosophical significance for many related epistemological topics (such as the problem of induction and the theory of causation). Spohn's research extends to philosophy of science, metaphysics and ontology, philosophy of language and mind, two-dimensional semantics, philosophical logic, and decision and game theory (see the collection of papers). His dissertation and his paper "Stochastic Independence, Causal Independence, and Shieldability" are precursors of the theory of Bayesian networks and their causal interpretation, which became the dominating statistical theory of causality after 1990. His paper How to Make Sense of Game Theory is a forerunner of epistemic game theory, which developed into an important branch of game theory. The novel game theoretic concept of a dependency equilibrium, which generalizes the basic notion of a Nash equilibrium, is first introduced in his paper Dependency Equilibria and the Causal Structure of Decision and Game Situations.
