= Fereydoon Family =

Fereydoon Family (born September 18, 1945) is a leading Persian physicist in the field of nanotechnology and solid-state physics. He is currently Samuel Candler Dobbs Professor of Physics and a member of the Emerson Center for Scientific Computation at Emory University in Atlanta, Georgia. He is an elected fellow of the American Physical Society, and a recipient of the Southeastern Section of the American Physical Society's highest honor, the J.W. Beams Award.

== Biography ==
Family received his B.S. degree in physics from Worcester Polytechnic Institute in 1968 and his Ph.D. in physics at Clark University in 1974. He has been a visiting scientist at the Institute for Theoretical Physics at the University of California at Santa Barbara and a visiting associate professor of chemistry at Massachusetts Institute of Technology.

== Publications ==
=== Journal articles ===
He has published 161 scientific papers, almost all of them in high-ranking peer-reviewed journals. The most heavily cited was cited as many as 547 times. The ten most frequently cited are:

- Family F, Vicsek T, Scaling of the Active Zone in the Eden Process on Percolation Networks and the Ballistic Deposition Model Journal of Physics A-Mathematical and General 18 (2): L75-L81 1985' (times cited: 547)
- Vicsek T, Family F, Dynamic Scaling for Aggregation of Clusters Physical Review Letters 52 (19): 1669-1672 1984 (times cited: 289)
- Family F, Dynamic Scaling and Phase-Transitions in Interface Growth Physica A 168 (1): 561-580 Sep 1 1990 (times cited: 259)
- Family F, Scaling of Rough Surfaces - Effects of Surface-Diffusion Journal of Physics A-Mathematical and General 19 (8): L441-L446 Jun 1 1986 (times cited: 252)
- Amar g, Family F, Critical Cluster-Size - Island Morphology and Size Distribution in Submonolayer Epitaxial-Growth Physical Review Letters 74 (11): 2066-2069 Mar 13 1995 (times cited: 213)
- Meakin P, Vicsek T, Family F, Dynamic Cluster-Size Distribution in Cluster-Cluster Aggregation - Effects of Cluster Diffusivity Physical Review B 31 (1): 564-569 1985 (times cited: 206)
- Amar J, Family F, Lam P, Dynamic Scaling of the Island-Size Distribution and Percolation in a Model of Submonolayer Molecular-Beam Epitaxy Physical Review B 50 (12): 8781-8797 Sep 15 1994 (times cited: 175)
- Amar J, Family F, Numerical-Solution of A Continuum Equation for Interface Growth in 2+1 Dimensions Physical Review A 41 (6): 3399-3402 Mar 15 1990 (times cited: 137)
- Family F, Meakin P, Scaling of the Droplet-Size Distribution in Vapor-Deposited Thin-Films Physical Review Letters 61 (4): 428-431 Jul 25 1988 (times Ccitedited: 133)
- Family F, Meakin P, Deutch J, Kinetics of Coagulation with Fragmentation - Scaling Behavior and Fluctuations Physical Review Letters 57 (6): 727-730 Aug 11 1986 (times cited: 127)
- Gould H, Family F, Stanley H, Kinetics of Formation of Randomly Branched Aggregates - A Renormalization-Group Approach Physical Review Letters 50 (9): 686-689 1983 (times cited: 122)

=== Books on physics ===
- Kinetics of Aggregation and Gelation (North-Holland, Amsterdam), 1984. (cited 115 times according to Google Scholar)
- Dynamics of Fractal Surfaces (World Scientific, Singapore), 1991. (cited 284 times according to Google Scholar)
- Fractal Aspects of Materials (Materials Research Society, Pittsburgh), 1995.
- Scaling and Disordered Systems (World-Scientific, Singapore), 2002.
- Challenges In Computational Statistical Physics In The 21st Century, Proceedings of STATPHYS satellite conference (Special Issue of Computer Physics Communications), 2002.
- Dynamics and Friction in the Submicrometer Confining Systems (American Chemical Society, Washington, DC), 2004.
