= Airy process =

The Airy processes are a family of stationary stochastic processes that appear as limit processes in the theory of random growth models and random matrix theory. They are conjectured to be universal limits describing the long time, large scale spatial fluctuations of the models in the (1+1)-dimensional KPZ universality class (Kardar–Parisi–Zhang equation) for many initial conditions (see also KPZ fixed point).

The original process Airy_{2} was introduced in 2002 by the mathematicians Michael Prähofer and Herbert Spohn. They proved that the height function of a model from the (1+1)-dimensional KPZ universality class - the PNG droplet - converges under suitable scaling and initial condition to the Airy_{2} process and that it is a stationary process with almost surely continuous sample paths.

The Airy process is named after the Airy function. The process can be defined through its finite-dimensional distribution with a Fredholm determinant and the so-called extended Airy kernel. It turns out that the one-point marginal distribution of the Airy_{2} process is the Tracy-Widom distribution of the GUE.

There are several Airy processes. The Airy_{1} process was introduced by Tomohiro Sasomoto and the one-point marginal distribution of the Airy_{1} is a scalar multiply of the Tracy-Widom distribution of the GOE. Another Airy process is the Airy_{stat} process.

The Airy_{1} resp. Airy_{2} processes can be thought of as the limit behavior of TASEP fluctuations with flat resp. step initial condition.

== Airy_{2} process ==
Let $t_1<t_2<\dots <t_n$ be in $\R$.

The Airy_{2} process $A_2(t)$ has the following finite-dimensional distribution

$$P(A_2(t_{1})<\xi_1,\dots,A_2(t_{n})<\xi_n)=\det(1-f^{1/2}K^{\operatorname{ext}}_{\operatorname{Ai}}f^{1/2})_{L^2(\{t_1,\dots,t_n\}\times \R)}$$

where

$$f:=f(t_j,\xi)=1_{\{(\xi_j,\infty)\}}(\xi)$$

and $K^{\operatorname{ext}}_{\operatorname{Ai}}:=K^{\operatorname{ext}}_{\operatorname{Ai}}(t_i,x;t_j,y)$ is the extended Airy kernel

$$K^{\operatorname{ext}}_{\operatorname{Ai}}(t_i,x;t_j,y):=\begin{cases}{\displaystyle \int_0^\infty e^{-z(t_i-t_j )}\operatorname{Ai}(x+z)\operatorname{Ai}(y+z)\mathrm{d}z}& \text{if }\;t_i\geq t_j,\\
{\displaystyle -\int_{-\infty}^0 e^{-z(t_i-t_j)}\operatorname{Ai}(x+z)\operatorname{Ai}(y+z)\mathrm{d}z}&\text{if }\;t_i< t_j.\end{cases}$$

=== Explanations ===
- If $t_i=t_j$ the extended Airy kernel reduces to the Airy kernel and hence

$$P(A_2(t)\leq \xi)=F_{2}(\xi),$$

where $F_{2}(\xi)$ is the Tracy-Widom distribution of the GUE.

- $f^{1/2}K^{\operatorname{ext}}_{\operatorname{Ai}}f^{1/2}$ is a trace class operator on $L^2(\{t_1,\dots,t_n\}\times \R)$ with counting measure on $\{t_1,\dots,t_n\}$ and Lebesgue measure on $\R$, the kernel is $f^{1/2}K^{\operatorname{ext}}_{\operatorname{Ai}}(t_i,x;t_j,y)f^{1/2}$.

== Literature ==
- Prähofer, Michael; Spohn, Herbert (2002). "Scale Invariance of the PNG Droplet and the Airy Process". Journal of Statistical Physics. 108 (5–6). Springer: 1071. arXiv:math/0105240. Bibcode:2002JSP...108.1071P. doi:10.1023/A:1019791415147.
- Johansson, Kurt (2003). "Discrete Polynuclear Growth and Determinantal Processes". Commun. Math. Phys. 242 (1–2). Springer: 290. arXiv:math/0206208. Bibcode:2003CMaPh.242..277J. doi:10.1007/s00220-003-0945-y.
- Tracy, Craig; Widom, Harold (2003). "A System of Differential Equations for the Airy Process". Electron. Commun. Probab. 8: 93–98. arXiv:math/0302033. doi:10.1214/ECP.v8-1074.
