= Martin Hairer =

Austrian-British mathematician

Sir Martin Hairer KBE FRS
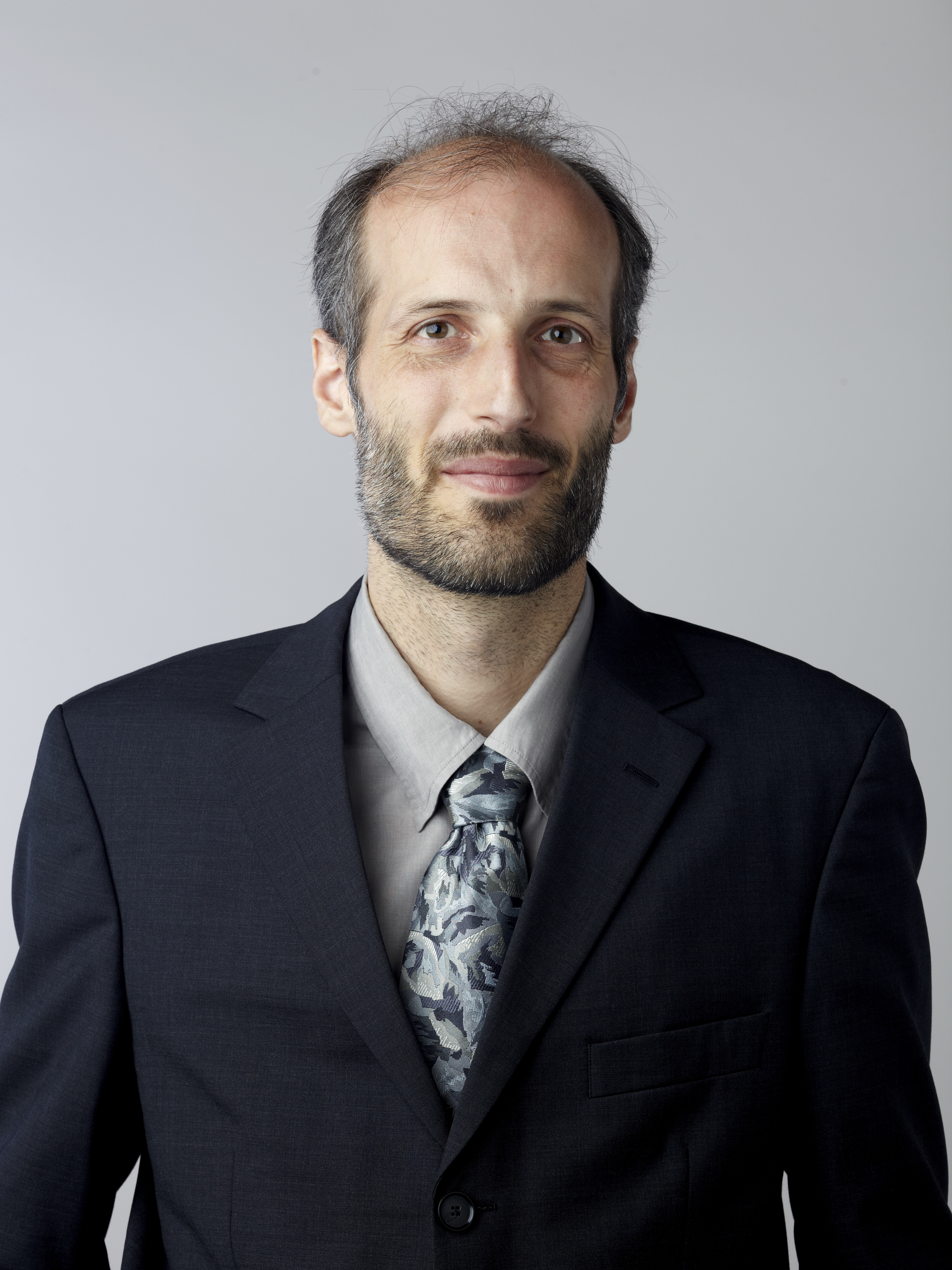
- Martin Hairer in 2014
- Born: 14 November 1975 (age 50); Geneva, Switzerland
- Citizenship: Austrian; British
- Education: University of Geneva
- Spouse: Xue-Mei Li (m. 2003)
- Father: Ernst Hairer
- Awards: Whitehead Prize (2008); Philip Leverhulme Prize (2008); Wolfson Research Merit Award (2009); Fermat Prize (2013); Fröhlich Prize (2014); Fields Medal (2014); Breakthrough Prize in Mathematics (2021); King Faisal Prize (2022); Sylvester Medal (2025)
- Scientific career
- Fields: Probability theory; Analysis
- Workplaces: École Polytechnique Fédérale de Lausanne; Imperial College London; University of Warwick; New York University
- Thesis: Comportement Asymptotique d'Équations à Dérivées Partielles Stochastiques (2001)
- Doctoral advisor: Jean-Pierre Eckmann
- Website: www.hairer.org

Sir Martin Hairer KBE FRS (born 14 November 1975) is an Austrian-British mathematician and mathematical physicist working in the field of stochastic analysis, in particular stochastic partial differential equations. He is Professor of Mathematics at École Polytechnique Fédérale de Lausanne (EPFL) and Imperial College London. He previously held appointments at the University of Warwick and the Courant Institute of New York University. In 2014 he was awarded the Fields Medal, one of the highest honours a mathematician can achieve. In 2020 he was awarded Breakthrough Prize in Mathematics.

== Early life and education ==
Hairer was born in Geneva, Switzerland. He attended the Collège Claparède Geneva where he received his high school diploma in 1994. He entered a school science competition with sound editing software that was developed into Amadeus, and later continued to maintain the software in addition to his academic work; it continued to be widely used as of 2020. He then attended the University of Geneva, where he obtained his Bachelor of Science degree in Mathematics in July 1998, Master of Science in Physics in October 1998 and PhD in Physics under the supervision of Jean-Pierre Eckmann in November 2001.

== Research and career ==
Hairer is active in the field of stochastic partial differential equations in particular, and in stochastic analysis and stochastic dynamics in general. He has worked on variants of Hörmander's theorem, systematisation of the construction of Lyapunov functions for stochastic systems, development of a general theory of ergodicity for non-Markovian systems, multiscale analysis techniques, theory of homogenisation, theory of path sampling and theory of rough paths and, in 2014, on his theory of regularity structures.

Under the name HairerSoft, he develops Macintosh software.

=== Affiliations ===
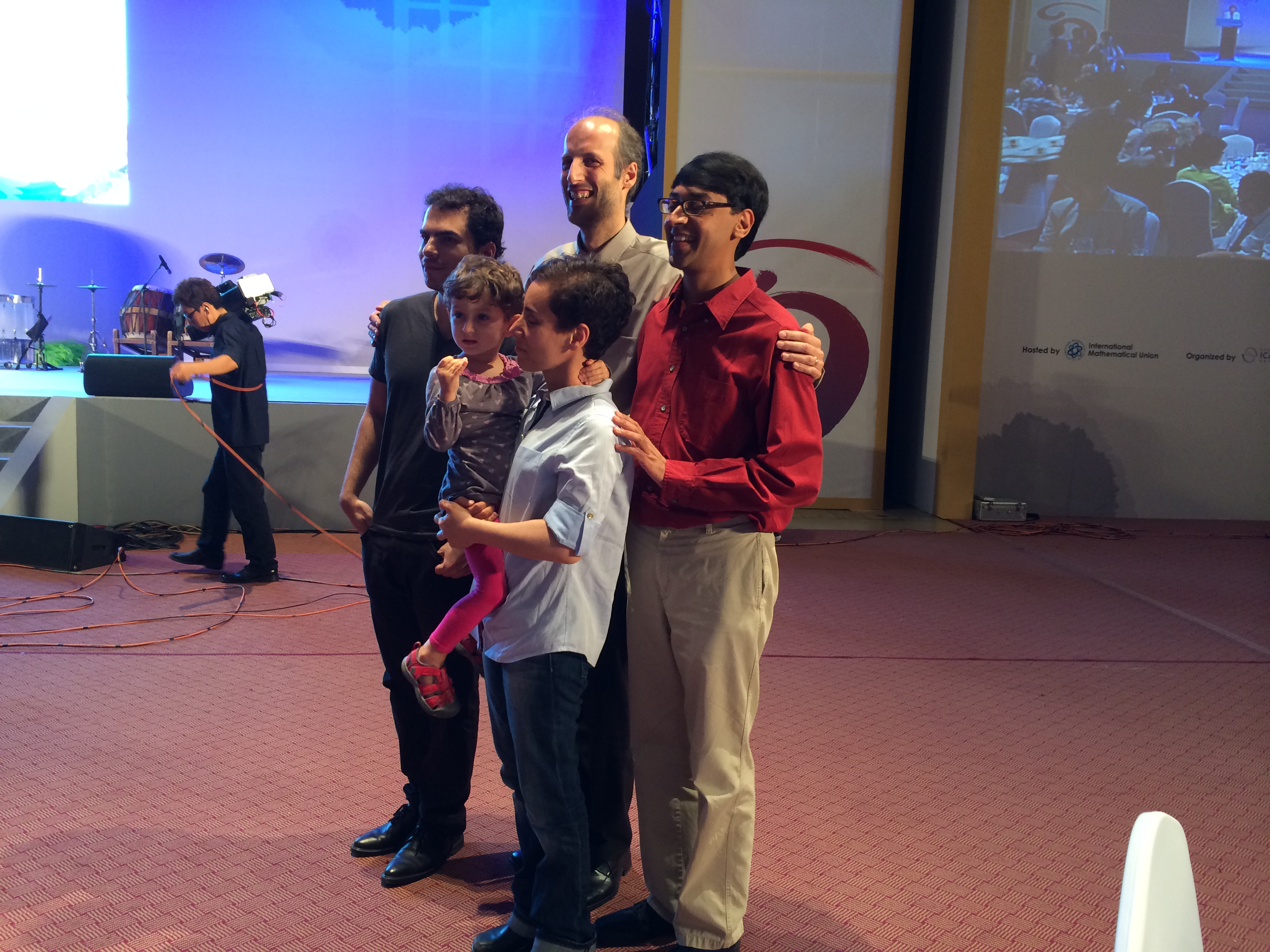
Four Fields medallists left to right (Artur Avila, Martin Hairer (at back), Maryam Mirzakhani, with Maryam's daughter Anahita and Manjul Bhargava) at the ICM 2014 in Seoul

- Regius Professor of Mathematics, University of Warwick (2014–2017)
- Member of the scientific steering committee of ETHZ-ITS (2013–2019)
- Institut Henri Poincaré, member of scientific steering committee (2012–2020)
- Mathematical Research Institute of Oberwolfach, member of steering committee (2013–2021)
- Editor, Probability Theory and Related Fields
- Editor, Nonlinear Differential Equations and Applications
- Editor, Annales Henri Poincaré Ser. B
- Editor, Electronic Journal of Probability
- Editor, Stochastic Partial Differential Equations: Analysis and Computations
- Visiting Professor, Université Paul Sabatier, Toulouse (December 2006 and February 2014)
- Visiting Professor, Technische Universität Berlin (July 2009)
- Visiting Professor, École Normale Supérieure, Paris (April 2013)
- Member, Institute for Advanced Study, Princeton (March – April 2014)
- Lipschitz Lectures, Hausdorff Center for Mathematics, University of Bonn (July 2013)
- Minerva Lectures, Columbia University (February 2014)
- Euler Lecture, Zuse Institute Berlin (May 2014)
- Medallion Lecture, Institute of Mathematical Statistics (July 2014)
- Lévy Lecture, Conference on Stochastic Processes and their Applications (July 2014)
- Fields Medal lecture, International Congress of Mathematicians, Seoul (August 2014)
- Collingwood Lecture, Durham University (February 2015)
- Bernoulli Lecture, École polytechnique fédérale de Lausanne (May 2015)
- Leonardo da Vinci Lecture, University of Milan (October 2015)
- Kai-Lai Chung Lecture, Stanford University (November 2015)
- Michalik Lecture, University of Pittsburgh (December 2015)

=== Awards and honours ===
- 2006–2011 Advanced Research Fellowship, Engineering and Physical Sciences Research Council (EPSRC)
- 2007 – Editors' Choice Award, Macworld
- 2008 – Whitehead Prize, London Mathematical Society
- 2008 – Philip Leverhulme Prize, Leverhulme Trust
- 2009 – Royal Society Wolfson Research Merit Award
- 2012 – Leverhulme Research Leadership Award, Leverhulme Trust
- 2013 – Fermat Prize, Institut de Mathématiques de Toulouse
- 2014 – Consolidator grant, European Research Council
- 2014 – Elected Fellow of the Royal Society (FRS) in 2014
- 2014 – Fröhlich Prize, London Mathematical Society
- 2014 – Fields Medal
- 2015 – Fellow of the American Mathematical Society
- 2015 – Member of the Austrian Academy of Sciences
- 2015 – Member of the Academy of Sciences Leopoldina
- 2015 – Member of the Academia Europaea
- 2016 – Honorary Knight Commander of the Order of the British Empire
- 2017 – Foreign member of the Polish Academy of Sciences
- 2019 – Substantive Knight Commander of the Order of the British Empire
- 2021 – Breakthrough Prize in Mathematics
- 2022 – King Faisal Prize
- 2022 – Medal of the Erwin Schrödinger International Institute for Mathematics and Physics
- 2025 – Sylvester Medal of the Royal Society.

== Personal life ==
Hairer holds Austrian and British nationality, and speaks French, German and English; he married fellow mathematician Li Xue-Mei in 2003. His father is Ernst Hairer, a mathematician at the University of Geneva.
