= KPZ fixed point =

In probability theory, the KPZ fixed point is a Markov field and conjectured to be a universal limit of a wide range of stochastic models forming the universality class of a non-linear stochastic partial differential equation called the KPZ equation. Even though the universality class was already introduced in 1986 with the KPZ equation itself, the KPZ fixed point was not concretely specified until 2021 when mathematicians Konstantin Matetski, Jeremy Quastel and Daniel Remenik gave an explicit description of the transition probabilities in terms of Fredholm determinants.

== Introduction ==
All models in the KPZ class have in common, that they have a fluctuating height function or some analogue function, that can be thought of as a function, that models the growth of the model by time. The KPZ equation itself is also a member of this class and the canonical model of modelling random interface growth. The strong KPZ universality conjecture conjectures that all models in the KPZ universality class converge under a specific scaling of the height function to the KPZ fixed point and only depend on the initial condition.

Matetski-Quastel-Remenik constructed the KPZ fixed point for the $(1+1)$-dimensional KPZ universality class (i.e. one space and one time dimension) on the polish space of upper semicontinuous functions (UC) with the topology of local UC convergence. They did this by studying a particular model of the KPZ universality class the TASEP („Totally Asymmetric Simple Exclusion Process“) with general initial conditions and the random walk of its associated height function. They achieved this by rewriting the biorthogonal function of the correlation kernel, that appears in the Fredholm determinant formula for the multi-point distribution of the particles in the Weyl chamber. Then they showed convergence to the fixed point.

== KPZ fixed point ==
Let $h(t,\vec{x})$ denote a height function of some probabilistic model with $(t,\vec{x})\in \mathbb{R}\times \mathbb{R}^d$ denoting space-time. So far only the case for $d=1$, also noted as $(1+1)$, was deeply studied, therefore we fix this dimension for the rest of the article. In the KPZ universality class exist two equilibrium points or fixed points, the trivial Edwards-Wilkinson (EW) fixed point and the non-trivial KPZ fixed point. The KPZ equation connects them together.

The KPZ fixed point is rather defined as a height function $\mathfrak{h}(t,\vec{x})$ and not as a particular model with a height function.

=== KPZ fixed point ===
The KPZ fixed point $(\mathfrak{h}(t,x))_{t\geq 0,x\in \R}$ is a Markov process, such that the n-point distribution for $x_1<x_2<\cdots <x_n\in\R$ and $t>0$ can be represented as

$$\mathbb{P}_{\mathfrak{h}(0,\cdot)}(\mathfrak{h}(t,x_1)\leq a_1,\mathfrak{h}(t,x_2)\leq a_2,\dots,\mathfrak{h}(t,x_n)\leq a_n)=\det(I-K)_{L^2(\{x_1,x_2,\dots,x_n\}\times \R)}$$

where $a_1,\dots,a_n\in\R$ and $K$ is a trace class operator called the extended Brownian scattering operator and the subscript means that the process in $\mathfrak{h}(0,\cdot)$ starts.

=== KPZ universality conjectures ===
The KPZ conjecture conjectures that the height function $h(t,\vec{x})$ of all models in the KPZ universality at time $t$ fluctuate around the mean with an order of $t^{1/3}$ and the spacial correlation of the fluctuation is of order $t^{2/3}$. This motivates the so-called 1:2:3 scaling which is the characteristic scaling for the KPZ fixed point. The EW fixed point has also a scaling the 1:2:4 scaling. The fixed points are invariant under their associated scaling.

==== 1:2:3 scaling ====
The 1:2:3 scaling of a height function is for $\varepsilon>0$

$$\varepsilon^{1/2}h(\varepsilon^{-3/2}t,\varepsilon^{-1}x)-C_{\varepsilon}t,$$

where 1:3 and 2:3 stand for the proportions of the exponents and $C_{\varepsilon}$ is just a constant.

==== Strong conjecture ====
The strong conjecture says, that all models in the KPZ universality class converge under 1:2:3 scaling of the height function if their initial conditions also converge, i.e.

$$\lim\limits_{\varepsilon\to 0}\varepsilon^{1/2}(h(c_1\varepsilon^{-3/2}t,c_2\varepsilon^{-1}x)-c_3\varepsilon^{-3/2}t)\;\stackrel{(d)}{=}\;\mathfrak{h}(t,x)$$

with initial condition

$$\mathfrak{h}(0,x):=\lim\limits_{\varepsilon\to 0}\varepsilon^{1/2}h(0,c_2\varepsilon^{-1}x),$$

where $c_1,c_2,c_3$ are constants depending on the model.

==== Weak conjecture ====
If we remove the growth term in the KPZ equation, we get

$$\partial_t h(t,x)= \nu \partial^2_x h +\sigma\xi,$$

which converges under the 1:2:4 scaling

$$\lim\limits_{\varepsilon\to 0}\varepsilon^{1/2}(h(c_1\varepsilon^{-2}t,c_2\varepsilon^{-1}x)-c_3\varepsilon^{-3/2}t)\;\stackrel{(d)}{=}\;\mathfrak{h}(t,x)$$

to the EW fixed point. The weak conjecture says now, that the KPZ equation is the only Heteroclinic orbit between the KPZ and EW fixed point.

=== Airy process ===
If one fixes the time dimension and looks at the limit

$$\lim\limits_{t\to\infty}t^{-1/3}(h(c_1t,c_2t^{2/3}x)-c_3t)\stackrel{(d)}{=}\;\mathcal{A}(x),$$

then one gets the Airy process $(\mathcal{A}(x))_{x\in\R}$ which also occurs in the theory of random matrices.
