= Regularity structure =

Framework for studying stochastic partial differential equations

Martin Hairer's theory of regularity structures provides a framework for studying a large class of subcritical parabolic stochastic partial differential equations arising from quantum field theory. The framework covers the Kardar–Parisi–Zhang equation, the $\Phi_3^4$ equation and the parabolic Anderson model, all of which require renormalization in order to have a well-defined notion of solution.

A key advantage of regularity structures over previous methods is its ability to pose the solution of singular non-linear stochastic equations in terms of fixed-point arguments in a space of “controlled distributions” over a fixed regularity structure. The space of controlled distributions lives in an analytical/algebraic space that is constructed to encode key properties of the equations at hand. As in many similar approaches, the existence of this fixed point is first poised as a similar problem where the noise term is regularised. Subsequently, the regularisation is removed as a limit process. A key difficulty in these problems is to show that stochastic objects associated to these equations converge as this regularisation is removed.

Hairer won the 2021 Breakthrough Prize in mathematics for introducing regularity structures.

== Definition ==
A regularity structure is a triple $\mathcal{T} = (A,T,G)$ consisting of:

- a subset $A$ (index set) of $\mathbb{R}$ that is bounded from below and has no accumulation points;
- the model space: a graded vector space $T = \oplus_{\alpha \in A} T_{\alpha}$, where each $T_{\alpha}$ is a Banach space; and
- the structure group: a group $G$ of continuous linear operators $\Gamma \colon T \to T$ such that, for each $\alpha\in A$ and each $\tau \in T_{\alpha}$, we have $(\Gamma-1)\tau \in \oplus_{\beta<\alpha} T_{\beta}$.

A further key notion in the theory of regularity structures is that of a model for a regularity structure, which is a concrete way of associating to any $\tau \in T$ and $x_{0} \in \mathbb{R}^{d}$ a "Taylor polynomial" based at $x_{0}$ and represented by $\tau$, subject to some consistency requirements. More precisely, a model for $\mathcal{T} = (A,T,G)$ on $\mathbb{R}^{d}$, with $d \geq 1$ consists of two maps

$$\Pi \colon \mathbb{R}^{d} \to \mathrm{Lin}(T; \mathcal{S}'(\mathbb{R}^{d}))$$,
$$\Gamma \colon \mathbb{R}^{d} \times \mathbb{R}^{d} \to G$$.

Thus, $\Pi$ assigns to each point $x$ a linear map $\Pi_{x}$, which is a linear map from $T$ into the space of distributions on $\mathbb{R}^{d}$; $\Gamma$ assigns to any two points $x$ and $y$ a bounded operator $\Gamma_{x y}$, which has the role of converting an expansion based at $y$ into one based at $x$. These maps $\Pi$ and $\Gamma$ are required to satisfy the algebraic conditions

$$\Gamma_{x y} \Gamma_{y z} = \Gamma_{x z}$$,
$$\Pi_{x} \Gamma_{x y} = \Pi_{y}$$,

and the analytic conditions that, given any $r > | \inf A |$, any compact set $K \subset \mathbb{R}^{d}$, and any $\gamma > 0$, there exists a constant $C > 0$ such that the bounds

$$| ( \Pi_{x} \tau ) \varphi_{x}^{\lambda} | \leq C \lambda^{|\tau|} \| \tau \|_{T_{\alpha}}$$,
$$\| \Gamma_{x y} \tau \|_{T_{\beta}} \leq C | x - y |^{\alpha - \beta} \| \tau \|_{T_{\alpha}}$$,

hold uniformly for all $r$-times continuously differentiable test functions $\varphi \colon \mathbb{R}^{d} \to \mathbb{R}$ with unit $\mathcal{C}^{r}$ norm, supported in the unit ball about the origin in $\mathbb{R}^{d}$, for all points $x, y \in K$, all $0 < \lambda \leq 1$, and all $\tau \in T_{\alpha}$ with $\beta < \alpha \leq \gamma$. Here $\varphi_{x}^{\lambda} \colon \mathbb{R}^{d} \to \mathbb{R}$ denotes the shifted and scaled version of $\varphi$ given by

$$\varphi_{x}^{\lambda} (y) = \lambda^{-d} \varphi \left( \frac{y - x}{\lambda} \right)$$.
