= Kurt Johansson =

Kurt Johansson may refer to:

- Kurt Johansson (sport shooter)
- Kurt Johansson (mathematician)

== See also ==
- Kurt Johannsen, Australian bush mechanic and inventor
